= Hermaphrodites with Attitude =

American newsletter edited by Cheryl Chase

- Editor: Cheryl Chase
- Categories: Intersex human rights, reproductive and sexual health
- Publisher: Intersex Society of North America
- First issue: 1994
- Final issue: 2005
- Country: United States
- Website: www.isna.org/library/hwa
- ISSN: 1084-5771
- OCLC: 33093388

Hermaphrodites with Attitude was a newsletter edited by Cheryl Chase and published by the Intersex Society of North America (ISNA) between 1994 and 2005. The full archives are available online. In 2008, ISNA transferred its remaining funds, assets, and copyrights to Accord Alliance and then closed.

== History ==
Hermaphrodites with Attitude was published on thirteen occasions over an eleven-year period. The first issue appeared in Winter 1994, comprising 6 pages of articles, analysis and case studies, including articles by people with lived experience, activists, physicians, and academics. It was distributed to subscribers in five countries and 14 States of the United States.

The newsletter provided a voice for intersex activists for the first time, becoming a resource for intersex people and academics. The title of the newsletter appears in the title of multiple articles describing the intersex movement, and was also displayed on banners at the first public demonstration by intersex people and allies, outside a pediatric conference in Boston, on October 26, 1996.

In the early part of the 21st-century, Intersex Society of North America (ISNA) took on staff for the first time and began to engage closely with the Lawson Wilkins Pediatric Endocrine Society, establishing a North American Task Force on Intersex. These developments were stated in the newsletter's first issue of the 21st-century, in February 2001, which also marked a change in name to "ISNA News".

== Shifting attitudes ==
This shift in name of the newsletter reflected a significant shift in the goals of ISNA. Initially, Emi Koyama states that "not only did intersex activists appropriate the medical label "intersex" as part of their identities, they also liberally used the word "hermaphrodite", which is now considered offensive, for example by naming the newsletter of Intersex Society of North America "Hermaphrodites With Attitude" and demonstrating under that name." Koyama argues that the intersex movement could not succeed with that label in addressing peer support needs, while identity politics drew in a different set of goals and interests. ISNA goals shifted to eradicate nomenclature based on hermaphroditism that was stated to be stigmatizing to intersex individuals, as well as potentially panic-inducing to parents of intersex children.

The suggested solution put forth by ISNA was to restructure the system of intersex taxonomy and nomenclature to not include the words 'hermaphrodite', 'hermaphroditism', 'sex reversal', or other similar terms. This "standard division of many intersex types into true hermaphroditism, male pseudohermaphroditism, and female pseudohermaphroditism" was described by ISNA and its advocates as confusing and clinically problematic, and a replacement term, disorders of sex development was proposed by Alice Dreger, Cheryl Chase and others in 2005.

ISNA itself folded in 2008, following publication of a clinical paper and new clinical standards that adopted the term disorders of sex development to replace not only hermaphroditism and associated terms, but also the term intersex, in medical settings. ISNA gave a statement saying that "at present, the new standard of care exists as little more than ideals on paper, thus falling short of its aim[s]" to fulfill its goals. The ISNA decided its best course of action was to "support a new organization with a mission to promote integrated, comprehensive approaches to care that enhance the overall health and well-being of persons [who are intersex] and their families." The ISNA transferred all of its remaining funds, assets, and copyrights to Accord Alliance and then closed.

ISNA has been survived or succeeded by several intersex civil society organizations, including the AIS Support Group USA (now called AISDSD), the Intersex Initiative, Bodies Like Ours, Organisation Intersex International, (now the Intersex Campaign for Equality) and Advocates for Informed Choice (now interACT).

== See also ==
- Intersex rights in the United States
- Intersex human rights
- Intersex Society of North America
