= InterAction Suisse =

Swiss organization for intersex people and allies

- Formation: October 26, 2017
- Founder: Audrey Aegerter & Deborah Abate
- Purpose: Intersex human rights, education and peer support
- Region served: Switzerland
- President: Audrey Aegerter
- Website: inter-action-suisse.ch

InterAction is a Swiss organization for intersex people, parents, friends and allies to educate, provide peer support and address human rights issues.

== History ==
The organization was created on October 26, 2017, Intersex Awareness Day, by co-founders Audrey Aegerter and Deborah Abate. Abate is the principal protagonist in the documentary film No Box For Me. An Intersex Story by Floriane Devigne.

The organization is chaired in 2019 by Audrey Aegerter and is affiliated with Organization Intersex International (OII), and ILGA-Europe. It is a member of the Istanbul Convention Network. and is supported by Astraea Lesbian Foundation for Justice.

== Goals ==
InterAction organization for intersex people, parents, friends and allies to educate, provide peer support and address human rights issues. The core mission of the organization is to provide intersex persons and family members with safe space to understand themselves, and to meet others.

InterAction campaigns to educate people, and end abuses and stigmatization of intersex people, including ending medical interventions on children before they are able to consent, with long-term consequences. InterAction works within Switzerland and internationally on these issues.

InterAction advocates for the depathologization of intersex bodies, and so uses nomenclature such as "variations of sexual development" rather than disorders of sex development. The organization prioritises the expertise of intersex people.

== Activities ==
The organization is a member of the Istanbul Convention Network, acting as the Swiss relay for monitoring and application of the Council of Europe Convention on Preventing and Combating Violence Against Women and Domestic Violence. The agreement provides a legally-binding framework on prevention of violence, including a provision on female genital mutilation (Article 38), which the organization considers relevant to the situation of intersex people.

The organization seeks to prohibit intersex medical interventions on intersex children, and submitted a motion proposing this to the Geneva Grand Council on April 10, 2019. The organization pleads with various branches of the Swiss government for reform to changes of name and sex, marriage law, and action to combat discrimination and hate crimes.

InterAction publicly signed a joint statement calling on the Congregation for Catholic Education to reconsider its position on issues relating to intersex people as expressed in the document Male and Female He Created Them.

InterAction participated in the Geneva and Zurich Pride Marches in 2019 and the Remember Stonewall March 2019 in Basel. On behalf of InterAction, Audrey Aegerter represents the interests of intersex people in the canton of Geneva Consultative Commission on issues related to sexual orientation, gender identity and gender expression.

The organization is regularly interviewed by journalists from the Swiss and French press on LGBTI issues, and in particular on issues affecting transgender or intersex people in Switzerland, in particular in relation to hyperandrogenism and the athlete Mokgadi Caster Semenya

== See also ==
- Intersex rights in Switzerland
- Intersex human rights
- Intersex civil society organizations

=== External links ===
- Official website
