= Intersex civil society organizations =

Intersex civil society organizations have existed since at least the mid-1980s. They include peer support groups and advocacy organizations active on health and medical issues, human rights, legal recognition, and peer and family support. Some groups, including the earliest, were open to people with specific intersex traits, while others are open to people with many different kinds of intersex traits.

== History ==
Intersex peer support and advocacy organizations have existed since at least 1985, with the establishment of the Androgen Insensitivity Syndrome Support Group Australia in 1985. The Androgen Insensitivity Syndrome Support Group (UK) established in 1988. The Intersex Society of North America (ISNA) may have been one of the first intersex civil society organizations to have been open to people regardless of diagnosis; it was active from 1993 to 2008.

In May 2019, more than 50 intersex-led organizations signed a multilingual joint statement condemning the introduction of "disorders of sex development" language into the International Classification of Diseases, stating that this causes "harm" and facilitates human rights violations, calling on the World Health Organization to publish clear policy to ensure that intersex medical interventions are "fully compatible with human rights norms".

== Resourcing ==
Intersex organizations are poorly resourced. An international report on The State of Trans* and Intersex Organizing by GATE and the American Jewish World Service in November 2013 found that, globally, "just over $40,000 addressed intersex issues" in 2010. At that time, "6% of all funding for human rights work went to promote LGBTI rights globally ($72.6 million out of $1.2 billion in total)."

The Astraea Lesbian Foundation for Justice established the first Intersex Human Rights Fund in 2015, in an attempt to address resourcing issues.

== International Intersex Forums ==
International gatherings are known to have begun in the mid-1990s, including an ISNA retreat in 1996 that brought together activists from North America and New Zealand, and also a summer school organised by OII-France in 2006. The retreat is documented in a short movie entitled Hermaphrodites Speak and the film Intersexion, and the summer school in a book, A qui appartiennent nos corps? Féminisme et luttes intersexes.

International Intersex Forums have taken place since 2011, organized by ILGA. These have brought together intersex activists and organisations from around the world, resulting in joint statements about human rights and bodily autonomy. The Malta declaration of the third forum called for an end to 'normalising' practices, prenatal screening and selective abortions, infanticide and killings, and non-consensual sterilisation. It also made recommendations on sex assignments of intersex children and adults.

== List of intersex organizations ==
This list contains both intersex-led organizations and some active allied organizations.

=== Africa ===
- Intersex South Africa
- Support Initiative for People with Congenital Disorders

=== Asia ===
- Intersex Asia
- Oii-Chinese
- OII Russia
- Srishti Madurai (India)

=== Europe ===
- Association of the Russian-Speaking Intersex
- Collectif intersexe activiste (CIA-OII France)
- InterAction Suisse (Switzerland)
- Internationale Vereinigung Intergeschlechtlicher Menschen (OII Germany)
- Intersex Russia
- Intersex UK
- OII Europe
- Organisation Internationale des Intersexes - Francophonie (OII French-speaking)
- OII UK
- Zwischengeschlecht (Switzerland/Germany)
- Caminar intersex (España -islas Canarias)
- İnter Dayanışma (Inter Solidarity Turkey)

=== Latin America ===
- Brújula Intersexual (Intersex Compass) (Mexico and Latin America)

=== North America ===
- Accord Alliance (USA)
- Brújula Intersexual (Intersex Compass)
- interACT, formerly known as Advocates for Informed Choice (USA)
- Intersex Campaign for Equality (IC4E), formerly OII-USA
- Intersex Society of North America (ISNA) (defunct)
- Organisation Internationale des Intersexes - Francophonie (Canada)

=== Oceania ===
- Intersex Human Rights Australia, formerly OII Australia
- Intersex Peer Support Australia (also known as AISSGA, Androgen Insensitivity Syndrome Support Group Australia)
- Intersex Trust Aotearoa New Zealand, also known as Intersex Awareness New Zealand

=== International ===
- GATE
- International Lesbian, Gay, Bisexual, Trans and Intersex Association (ILGA)
- Organisation Intersex International (OII)

== See also ==
- Intersex human rights
- List of intersex people
- Legal recognition of intersex people
- List of LGBT rights organizations
