= XXXY =

XXXY may refer to:

- XXXY (film), 2000, a documentary.
- XX/XY (film), 2002, a romantic drama.
- XXXY syndrome
