= Sally Gross =

Sally Gross may refer to:

- Sally Gross (activist) (1953–2014), South African intersex, anti-apartheid activist
- Sally Gross (choreographer) (1933–2015), American choreographer and dancer
