= Intersex Society of North America =

Advocacy group for intersex people in the U.S. and Canada

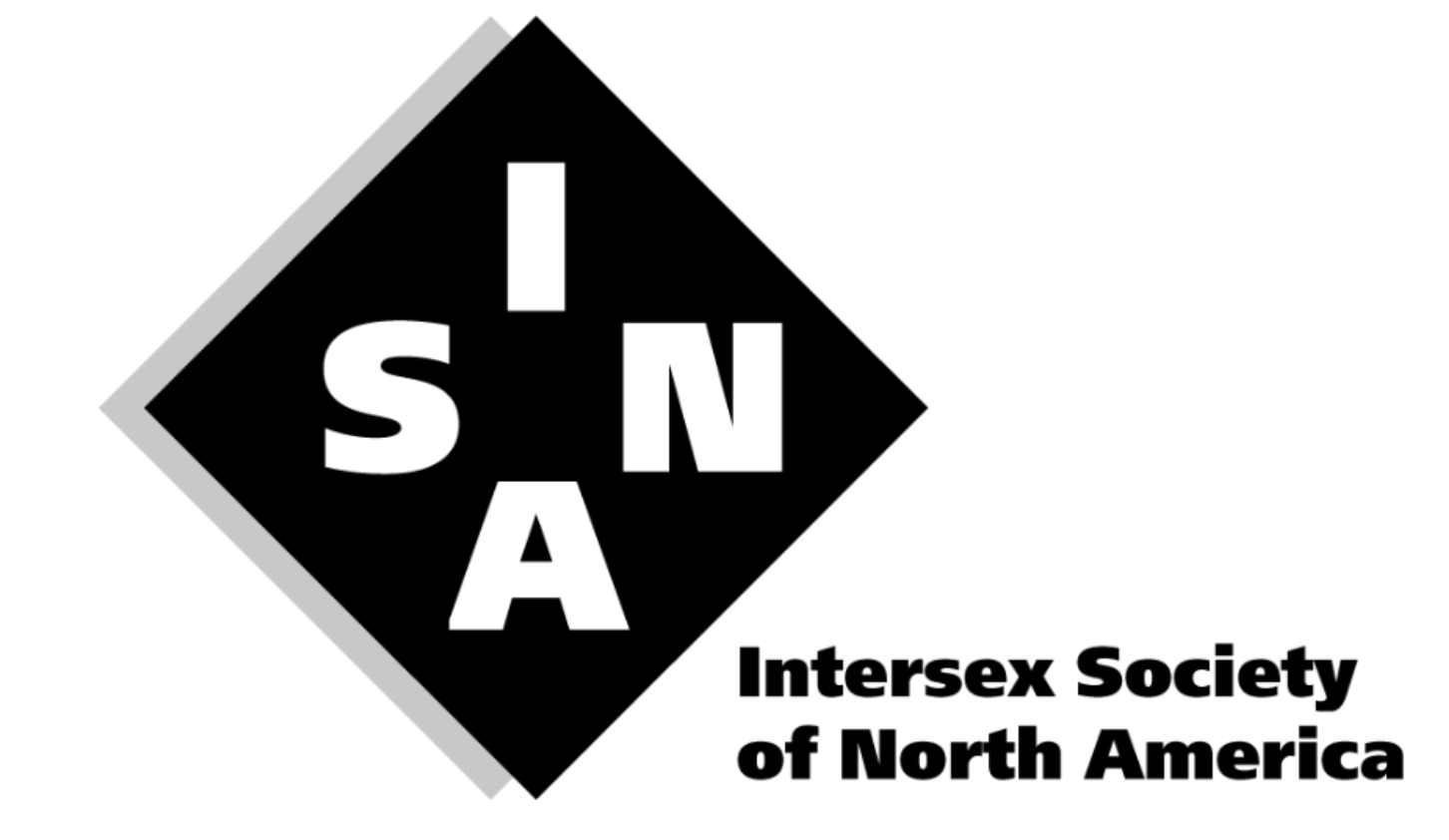
- Abbreviation: ISNA
- Formation: 1993
- Dissolved: 2008
- Type: NGO
- Purpose: Intersex human rights
- Region served: United States and Canada
- Website: isna.org

The Intersex Society of North America (ISNA) was a non-profit advocacy group founded in 1993 by Cheryl Chase to end shame, secrecy, and unnecessary genital surgeries on intersex people. Other notable members included Morgan Holmes, Max Beck, Howard (Tiger) Devore, Esther Morris Leidolf and Alice Dreger. The organization closed in June 2008, and has been succeeded by a number of health, civil and human rights organizations including interACT.

== Advocacy ==
=== Physical integrity and bodily autonomy ===
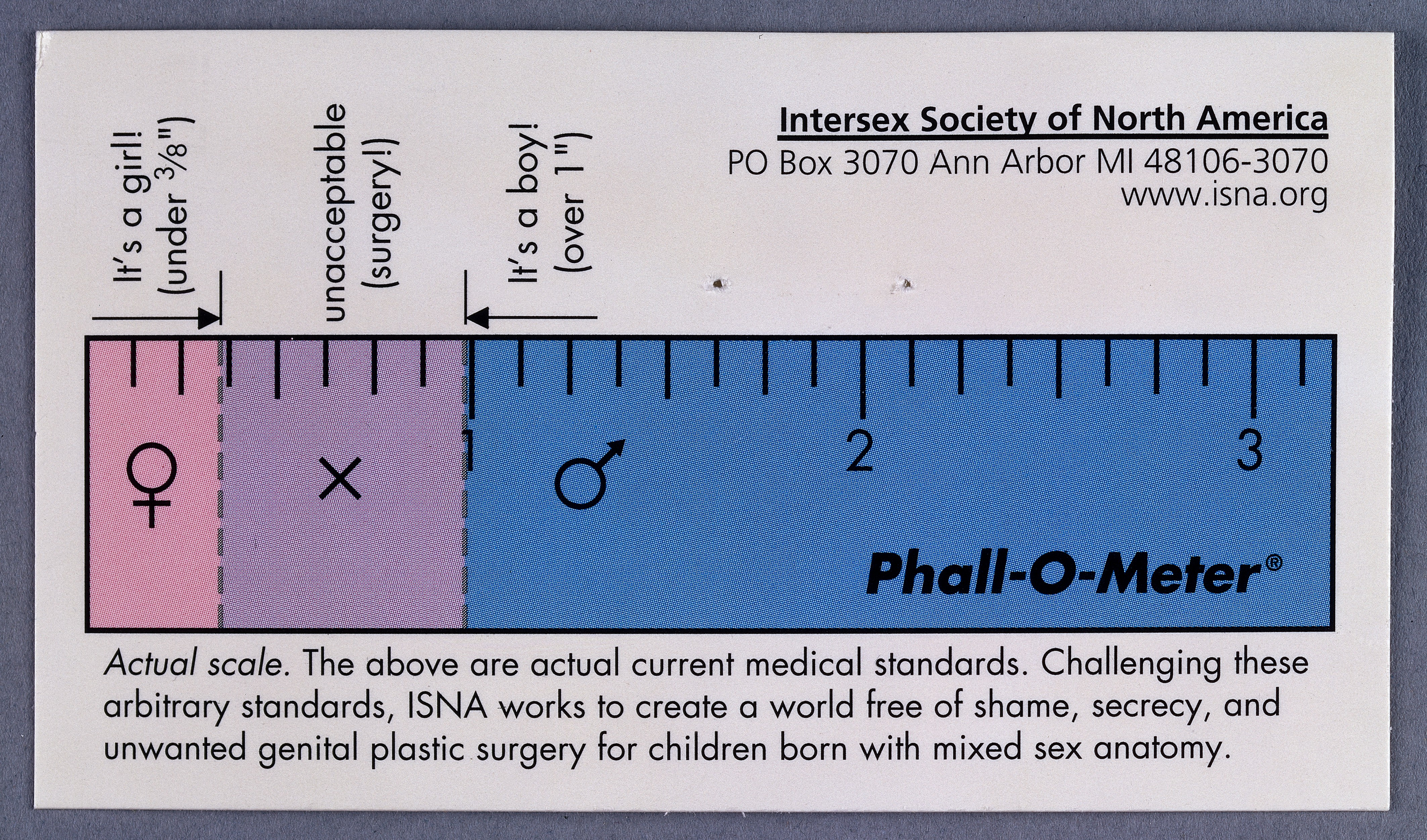
The Phall-O-Meter satirizes clinical assessments of appropriate clitoris and penis length at birth. It is based on research published by Suzanne Kessler

ISNA stated that newborn intersex genitals should not be operated on, unless they need to be in order to maintain the child's physical health. It was (and to some extent still is) a common belief that a child's genitals needed to conform to average genitals of a male or female, so in the first 24 hours after birth, doctors could perform "extensive reconstructive surgery in order to avoid damage to the child's mental health" (56). On the other hand, the ISNA claimed there is "no evidence that children who grow up with intersex genitals are worse off psychologically than those who are altered" and that there is "no evidence that early surgery relieves parental distress". They believed it to be inhumane to choose someone's genitals for them. This being said, the ISNA did not condemn surgery in general, and believed that intersex people should be allowed to opt for genital reconstruction, if they want to, when they can fully consent to the operations themselves.

Alice Dreger has described how the work of clinical psychologist and surgeries survivor Tiger Devore was integral to the work of ISNA:

Devore contributed to ISNA and to the intersex rights movement the outline of what a reformed clinical system would look like: Intersex children would be given preliminary gender assignments as boys and girls (recognizing that all gender assignment is preliminary and does not require surgery); hormonal and surgical interventions would be limited to those that were needed to treat clear and present medical problems, with all elective interventions waiting until patients could consent for themselves; intersex children and adults (and their loved ones) would be provided professional, non-shaming psychosocial support and peer support.

The ISNA advocated a move from a "Concealment-Centered Model" to a Patient-Centered Model. This push was to move away from a model that teaches both that "intersex is a rare anatomical abnormality" and that there needs to be immediate surgery to normalize the child's abnormal genitals, and moved toward the idea that "intersex is a relatively common anatomical variation from the 'standard' male and female types". The attempt is to treat intersex as something that is natural, as to not ostracize the intersex community, and to allow intersex people to be treated with the same ethical principles that doctors show to any other patient.

The Patient-Centered Model believes that "psychological distress is a legitimate concern and should be addressed by properly trained professionals". This means that both intersex people and family members who feel burdened in any way should seek both the help of counselors trained in sex and gender issues and the support from a community of peers experiencing the same situation. This allows a network of support to help everyone through any trying times that might arise. The model also states that "care should be more focused on addressing stigma, not solely gender assignment and genital appearance." The Model attempts a more caring approach toward people with intersex characteristics.

Released in August 2006, the Consensus Statement on Management of Intersex Disorders was a document published in Pediatrics that mapped out a new standard of care for intersex people. According to the ISNA, it made three ground-breaking changes that advocated a Patient-Centered Model, a cautious approach to surgery, and an attempt to get rid of misleading language, all of which were backed by the ISNA. However, the statement still permits surgeries, and both clinicians and civil society organizations question implementation. Intersex scholars such as Georgiann Davis and Morgan Holmes state that, instead, the statement retrenched medical authority over infants and children with intersex conditions.

=== First North American demonstration by intersex people ===
Members of ISNA held the first ever North American demonstration about intersex issues: a 1996 demonstration by Morgan Holmes, Max Beck and others as Hermaphrodites with Attitude outside the Annual Meeting of the American Academy of Pediatrics in Boston. Georgiann Davis describes how, when the intersex movement began, "medical professional refused to engage intersex activists", and how rapidly the movement's strategy developed. "By the year 2000, Chase was delivering a plenary address to the Lawson Wilkins Pediatric Endocrine Society, a group she was once protesting against... It marked the first time an activist's perspective was solicited by organizers of a major medical conference."

The 1996 demonstration is now commemorated internationally as Intersex Awareness Day.

=== Identification documents ===
ISNA, like the 2013 International Intersex Forum believed that "newborns with intersex should be given a gender assignment as boy or girl". Their reasoning is that they think it would be impossible to know where male ends and intersex begins or where female ends and intersex begins. They want to "make the world a safe place for intersex kids", and they believe that marking them as a third gender would exile them.

=== Publications ===
ISNA published the journal Hermaphrodites with Attitude, edited by Cheryl Chase, between 1994 and 2005. The first issue appeared in Winter 1994, containing six pages of articles, analysis and case studies, including articles by people with lived experience, activists, doctors and academics. It was distributed to subscribers in five countries and 14 States of the United States.

=== Language ===
In a significant shift from publishing a regular journal titled Hermaphrodites with Attitude and demonstrating using the same name, the last stated goal of the organization was to eradicate what the organization deemed as "misleading language". The ISNA claimed that nomenclature based on hermaphroditism was stigmatizing to intersex individuals, as well as potentially panic-inducing to parents of intersex children. The suggested solution put forth by the ISNA was to restructure the system of intersex taxonomy and nomenclature to not include the words 'hermaphrodite', 'hermaphroditism', 'sex reversal', or other similar terms. This "standard division of many intersex types into true hermaphroditism, male pseudohermaphroditism, and female pseudohermaphroditism" is described by the ISNA and its advocates as confusing and clinically problematic.

The ISNA attempted to dispel what it sees as "harmful language" by providing information on intersex definitions and prevalence. The Intersex Society of North America stated that the term hermaphrodite is a "mythological term" and a "physiologic impossibility"; true hermaphrodites cannot exist.

While some intersex people seek to reclaim the word "hermaphrodite" with pride to reference themselves (much like the words "dyke" and "queer" have been reclaimed by LBGT people), the ISNA suggested that be avoided. They believed that it will not help the cause of intersex rights and could in fact be counter productive as people would not understand that word is being used as an attempt to empower intersex people, not classify them.

=== International work ===
ISNA made various efforts to spread intersex activism, and were a resource for a 1999 Colombian court case decision on surgical guidelines for intersex children.

== Closure and succession ==
By 2008, even though ISNA felt that they were able to come to a "consensus on improvements to [medical] care" for people born intersex with a large amount of the medical community, they ran into many problems in implementing these ideas. There was a "concern among many healthcare professionals, parents, and mainstream healthcare system funders that ISNA's views are biased", and many of these people feared that they would be shunned by colleagues if it was found out they were associated with the ISNA. The ISNA gave a statement saying that "at present, the new standard of care exists as little more than ideals on paper, thus falling short of its aim[s]" to fulfill its goals. The ISNA decided its best course of action was to "support a new organization with a mission to promote integrated, comprehensive approaches to care that enhance the overall health and well-being of persons [who are intersex] and their families."

The ISNA website identifies interACT as a successor, and the organization charged with preserving the site as a "historical archive". The Accord Alliance, which opened in April 2008, was also a successor to ISNA.

Writing in Sociology of Diagnosis, Georgiann Davis describes Organisation Intersex International (OII) and ISNA as "activist organisations". OII continues today with affiliates in many countries. Other intersex and DSD activist and advocacy organisations also continue their work around the world. interACT, Organisation Intersex International, and many other organizations participate in the International Intersex Forum.

== See also ==
- Intersex Awareness Day
- Intersex civil society organizations
- Intersex human rights
- Intersex rights by country
- Intersex rights in the United States
- Timeline of intersex history
