= Collectif intersexe activiste =

French not-for-profit association

Collectif intersexea activiste - OII France (CIA-OII France)
- Formation: November 8, 2016
- Founder: Loé Petit, Lysandre Nury
- Purpose: Intersex human rights, education and peer support
- Region served: France
- President: Lil'r Nury
- Website: cia-oiifrance.org

The Collectif intersexe activiste - OII France ("Intersex activist collective - OII France"; the collective"), until 2022 known as the Collectif intersexes et allié.e.s, abbreviated to CIA-OII France, is a not-for-profit association founded in 2016 by Loé Petit and Lysandre Nury. It aims to defend and support intersex people.

The collective works to end forced and coercive medical interventions on intersex people, particularly children. It also works to remove reference to sex or gender in legal identification documents. The collective participated in hearings of the National Assembly of France.

== History ==
The collective was officially launched on November 8, 2016, marked as Intersex Day of Solidarity, by Loé Petit and Lysandre Nury. The launch was prompted by discussions among French-speaking members of Organisation Intersex International.

== Objectives ==
The collective takes a position against the pathologization of intersex people, and in particular against forced and coercive medical practices on children who present with anatomical differences from medical and social norms for male or female bodies. The collective considers that individuals should be able to choose whether or not to undergo such interventions.

According to La Croix, the birth of the collective is associated with the emergence in the early 2010s of a second generation of intersex activists. The collective has since played a "key role in advancing its cause" ("un rôle clé pour faire avancer sa cause"), "participating in a large number of hearings, in particular in the Senate, but also in the [National Consultative Committee on Ethics] or the National Assembly" ("participant à un très grand nombre d'auditions, notamment au Sénat mais aussi au CCNE ou à l'Assemblée nationale)."

In 2020, the collective is the only association whose main goal is to defend the interests of intersex people in France

In 2019 the collective was supported by the Astraea Lesbian Foundation for Justice

== Activities ==
Since its creation, the collective has participated in the Existrans march, has appeared before hearings of national institutions and has published resources on intersex issues.

The collective welcomed a July 2018 report on bioethics by the Council of State in July 2018. In September 2018, it launched a petition as part of its campaign to "stop intersex mutilation"., receiving coverage in Libération. As at January 22, 2020, the petition had gathered 66,400 signatures. On October 25, 2018, Benjamin Pitcho, Benjamin Moron-Puech and a representative of the collective participated in a hearing of the National Assembly in relation to a bill on bioethics. On January 22, 2019, the association again participate in a hearing of the National Assembly On June 17, 2019, the collective held a conference on the rights of intersex people at the National Assembly, in collaboration with the Espace de réflexion éthique de la région Île-de-France.

Alongside lawyers, associations and deputies to the National Assembly, the collective co-signed a platform on July 4, 2019, denouncing a tet by medical doctors that favoured early surgeries on intersex children. On September 13, 2019, a National Assembly special committee on the bioethics bill rejected amendments aimed at prohibiting non-urgent modifications to sex characteristics without consent. On October 8, Deputy Raphaël Gérard presented amendment 2334 for the care of intersex persons and children, which was subsequently adopted by the National Assembly.

Since 2017, the collective has organized annual national intersex meetings with the support of the Délégué interministériel à la lutte contre le racisme, l'antisémitisme et la haine anti-LGBT. In 2017 and 2018, between October 26 (Intersex Awareness Day) and November 8 (Intersex Day of Solidarity), the collective organized the Fortnight of Intersex Visibility.

On October 26, 2018, the collective published a French translation of the OII Europe guide to Supporting your intersex child, a parents' toolkit, as a collaboration with OII Europe. In November 2018the collective launched "PEVI", a support network for parents of intersex children.

The collective has assisted the national Association of LGBT Journaliststo add a chapter on intersex to its media kit for journalists. The collective supports LGBT centers and organisations to add an I for intersex to their acronyms in ways that respect interse people, including the LGBTI Center in Tours.

In 2020 the collective launched the Twitter hashtag #JeSuisIntersexe (#IAmIntersex), intended to lift the taboo around intersex people.

== Awards and recognition ==
On May 17, 2019, the collective received a special mention in the International Prize of the City of Paris for the rights of LGBTQI+ people. The association also won a prize at the 2019 European Tolenrentia Awards.

== See also ==
- Intersex rights in France
- Intersex human rights
- Intersex civil society organizations

=== External links ===
- Official website
