= Max Beck =

American intersex advocate

- Born: 1966
- Died: January 12, 2008 (aged 41–42)
- Occupation: Activist
- Known for: Intersex activism

Max Beck (1966 – January 12, 2008) was an American intersex advocate, who was active in the now-defunct Intersex Society of North America (ISNA). On October 26, 1996, in Boston, Beck participated in the first known public demonstration against human rights violations on intersex people. The event is now annually commemorated and recognized as Intersex Awareness Day.

== Early life ==
Max Beck has described how his sex was not determinable at birth. Through testing it was discovered that he had mosaic XY/X0 chromosomes. His gonads were removed, and he was raised female, with yearly visits to endocrinologists and urologists. Beck's genitals were described as not yet "finished". Puberty "came in pill form", with a vaginoplasty, and he later attempted suicide. He survived and later met Tamara Alexander, later his wife, and subsequently switched hormone treatment to testosterone. The couple married on February 12, 2000. Alexander describes how the medical management of Beck's childhood is an "analogue for childhood sexual abuse", where disclosure and living were a blessing.

== Activism ==
Beck has described how his activism began in 1996. In that year, he and Morgan Holmes acted as spokespersons for ISNA and participants in a demonstration outside the conference of the American Academy of Pediatrics on October 26, 1996, alongside allies from Transsexual Menace including Riki Wilchins. Holmes has written that the event was intended not as a demonstration but as participation in the conference. She states that the pair went to deliver an address, "on long-term outcomes and to challenging their still-prevailing opinion that cosmetic surgery to "fix" intersexed genitals was the best course of action", but were "met, officially, with hostility and were escorted out of the conference by security guards". Following the event, the academy published a press release stating that "From the viewpoint of emotional development, 6 weeks to 15 months seems the optimal period for genital surgery."

Beck appears in the 2005 documentary Middle Sexes: Redefining He and She. The film was nominated for a 2006 GLAAD Media Award. Beck's wife, Tamara Beck, appears in the film Intersexion, recalling their relationship.

== Death ==
Beck died of Müllerian/vaginal cancer at age 42 in early 2008, leaving his wife Tamara and two children. In response to his death, Cheryl Chase stated that clinicians were unable to understand the "health issues of someone with his condition". Beck is remembered as an eloquent and patient advocate, an honest and powerful truthteller.

== Selected bibliography ==
- Beck, Max (October 30, 2001). "My Life as an Intersexual". PBS.
- Beck, Max (1997). "Hermaphrodites with Attitude Take to the Streets". Chrysalis. 2 (5). Intersex Society of North America: 45–50.

== See also ==
- Intersex human rights
- Intersex Awareness Day
