= XXXY (film) =

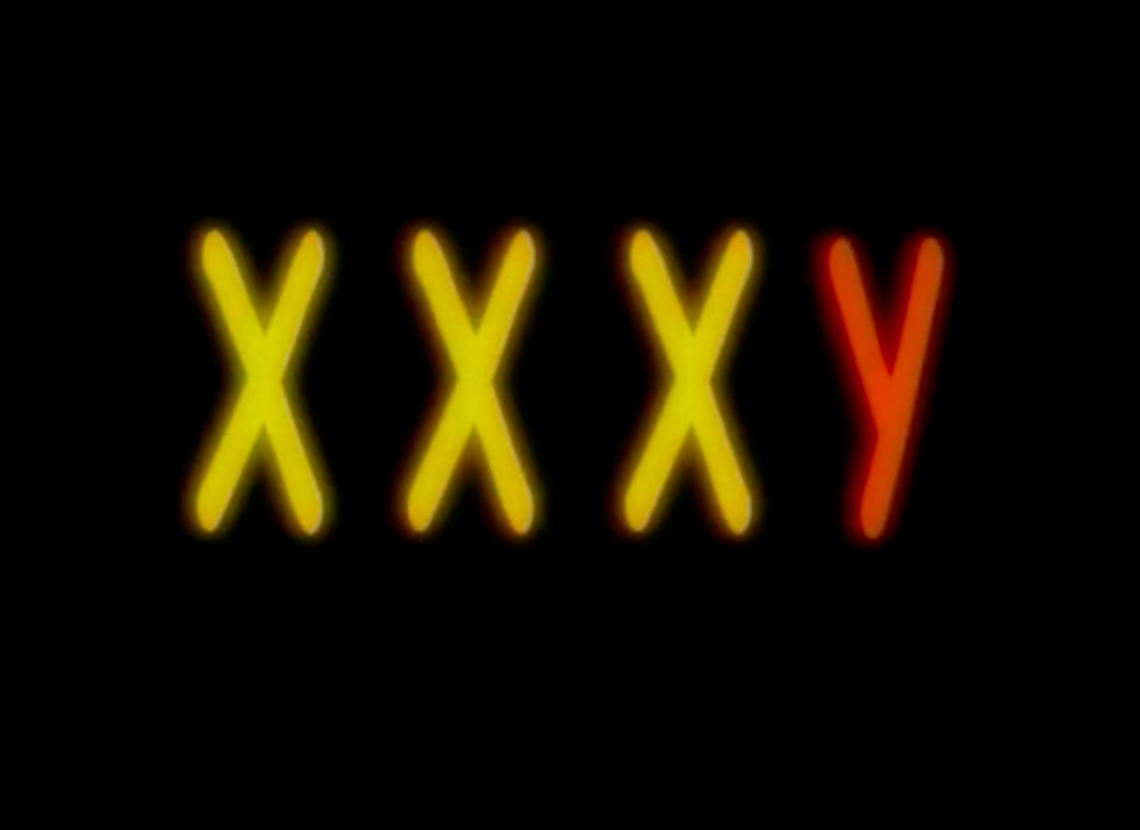
- Directed by: Porter Gale, Laleh Soomekh
- Starring: Jim Ambrose; Howard Devore; Jorge Daaboul, MD; Alice Bruce; John Bruce
- Production companies: Stanford University, Department of Art & Art History
- Distributed by: Berkeley Media, LLC
- Release date: June 22, 2000
- Running time: 13 minutes
- Country: United States
- Language: English

XXXY is a short documentary directed by Porter Gale and Laleh Soomekh.

The film features two people born intersex: San Francisco bicycle messenger Kristi Bruce and clinical psychologist Tiger Devore. The full movie is available online.

== Synopsis ==
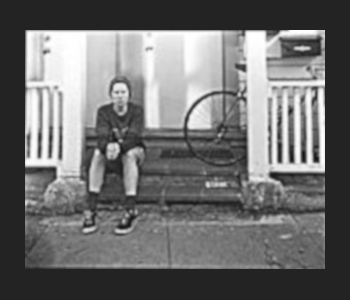
Kristi Bruce, San Francisco, California, 2000

Jim Ambrose (formerly Kristi Bruce) and Tiger Devore tell their stories. Jorge Daaboul, medical director of Pediatric Endocrinology, Diabetes & Metabolism at Florida Hospital for Children, provides a clinical perspective. Jim's parents, Alice and John, discuss their experience raising a child born with a variation of sex anatomy.

== Reception ==
Widely praised, XXXY received a number of awards including the 2001 Student Academy Award for Best Documentary, and the Student Award for Best Documentary at the 6th Annual Palm Springs International Festival of Short Films. The film was recommended viewing for the PlanetOut.com Second Queer Short Film Festival, and went on to screen at more than a dozen national and international film festivals.

Winston Wilde, Professor of Human Sexuality and Behavioral Sciences at Santa Monica College called the movie, "the finest film on the issues of intersex Americans, and an indispensable tool for instructors of Human Sexuality, Gender Identity, and Social Psychology."

Filmmaker Magazine called XXXY "essential filmmaking ... the film's stripped down quality — talking heads, the occasional shot of a childhood home, or Kristi on a bike — means there's nothing to interfere with the pair's stories; the impact is profound."

Demonstrating continued relevance, The New Yorker published a feature on XXXY, "A New Era for Intersex Rights" on December 30, 2013.

== Awards ==
- Best Documentary – 2001 Student Academy Awards
- Finalist – PlanetOut.com Gay & Lesbian Online Movie Awards
- Jury Award Winner – New York Exposition of Short Film and Video
- Best Student Documentary Award – Palm Springs Shorts Film Festival
- Honorable Mention – Directors Guild of America
- Honorable Mention – Making Waves Film Festival
- Honoree – Louisville Film and Video Festival
- Honoree – San Francisco Gay and Lesbian Intl. Film Festival
- Honoree – Western Psychological Association
- Screened at more than a dozen national and international film festivals

== See also ==
- Intersex human rights
- Intersex rights in the United States
- Self-determination
- Bodily integrity
- Hermaphrodite
