= Sally Gross (activist) =

South African activist (1953–2014)

- Gross in 1993
- Born: Selwyn Gross; 22 August 1953; Wynberg, Cape Town
- Died: 14 February 2014 (aged 60); Cape Town, South Africa
- Occupation: Community activist
- Known for: Anti-apartheid activist; intersex activist; founder of Intersex South Africa
- Website: intersex.org.za

Sally Gross (born Selwyn Gross; 22 August 1953 – 14 February 2014) was an anti-apartheid and intersex activist. A member of the African National Congress during the apartheid era, and the founder of Intersex South Africa, Gross acted as a mentor to intersex activists around the globe.

== Early life and diagnosis ==
Gross was born on 22 August 1953 to a Jewish family, classified as male, and named Selwyn Gross. Although aware of her genital ambiguities, she was only formally diagnosed as having an intersex variation in 1993 at age 40. She was subsequently reclassified as female.

== Spirituality, refugee status, and early works ==
Although born to a Jewish family, Gross was drawn to Catholicism and was baptised in early 1976. She fled South Africa in May 1977, on the advice of colleagues in the African National Congress, moving to Botswana and then later to Israel where her parents had settled, before becoming a novice in the Dominican Order in Oxford, England, in 1981. She was ordained a deacon in "around 1985" and a priest in 1987, and then taught moral theology and ethics at Blackfriars in Oxford. She holds a master's degree from Oxford University. In 1987, Gross served as a delegate in an ANC conference, headed by Thabo Mbeki, in Dakar, Senegal. She was invited to teach in South Africa by the Dominicans once the South African ban on the ANC was lifted in 1990.

Gross gained Israeli citizenship but lost her South African citizenship during her time as a refugee, which was restored in 1991. In the early 1990s she began to "discern and explore" issues around her body and identity; she took a leave of absence from the Dominican Order, and moved to Eastbourne in England. A year later, her clerical status was stripped and she considered herself removed from communion with the Church. She later found a spiritual home in the Religious Society of Friends (Quakers), and in Buddhism.

Her return to South Africa was complicated by a loss of citizenship during the apartheid era, and her change of sex classification. Granted a passport with a male sex descriptor in 1991, her requests for a passport with a female sex descriptor were passed around the South African Home Affairs and Health Departments. Gross rejected a suggestion of "genital "disambiguation" surgery" as "an immoral suggestion". Eventually she was granted a passport and a birth certificate with female sex markers, on the basis of a mistaken original classification.

== Intersex activism ==
Gross was a founder of Intersex South Africa, an autonomous intersex community organisation affiliated with Organisation Intersex International.

In 2000, Sally secured the first known mention of intersex in national law, with the inclusion of "intersex" within the definition of "sex" in the anti-discrimination law of the Republic of South Africa. Since then, she helped to draft legislation on the Alteration of Sex Descriptors, and the Promotion of Equality.

Gross was a public speaker on intersex issues, and she was interviewed by the BBC World Service on intersex and the Caster Semenya affair in September 2009. She appears in a video for It Gets Better South Africa in April 2013. Gross also participated in the first International Intersex Forum in 2011 and appears in the documentary Intersexion. Via Skype, Gross presented a paper entitled "Not in God's Image: Intersex, Social Death and Infanticide" to a conference on Intersex, Theology and the Bible in March 2013 by the Manchester University Religion and Civil Society Network.

== Death ==
The Daily Maverick newspaper reported that Gross died alone in her apartment in Cape Town on 14 February 2014, "having been forced to appeal to friends for funds to pay rent and medical bills as her health deteriorated; she was virtually immobile." In obituaries by Organisation Intersex International, Intersex Trust Aotearoa New Zealand and the Star Observer newspaper, Gross is remembered as a gentle and fearless advocate, and a mentor.

== See also ==
- Intersex rights in South Africa
