= Esther Morris Leidolf =

American intersex activist

- Occupations: Activist; Writer
- Website: mrkh.org

Esther Morris Leidolf is an American medical sociologist, and author of NOT UNCOMMON, Just Unheard of. An intersex activist, writer, and the founder of the MRKH Organization, Leidolf was the board secretary for the Intersex Society of North America.

== Career ==
Leidolf is a US-based medical sociologist with a background in public health data management, writer, the founder of the MRKH Organization, and was the board secretary for the now-defunct Intersex Society of North America. In roles with ISNA and MRKH Organization, Leidolf spoke at conferences and events, including the LGBTI Health Summit. Works include The Missing Vagina Monologue. Leidolf has stated,

"Being born without a vagina was not my problem. Having to get one was the real problem."

Alongside other activists, Leidolf was critical of a 2006 shift in clinical language from intersex to disorders of sex development. Leidolf also appears in the award-winning 2012 documentary Intersexion.

== Selected bibliography ==
- Leidolf, Esther; Curran, Megan; Scout; Bradford, Judith (May 2008). "Intersex Mental Health and Social Support Options in Pediatric Endocrinology Training Programs". Journal of Homosexuality. 54 (3): 233–242. doi:10.1080/00918360801982074. ISSN 0091-8369. PMID 18825861. S2CID 205468762.
- Leidolf, Esther Morris (July 2006). "The Missing Vagina Monologue … and Beyond". Journal of Gay & Lesbian Psychotherapy. 10 (2): 77–92. doi:10.1300/J236v10n02_05. ISSN 0891-7140.
- Morris, Esther (February 2, 2004). "The self I will never know". New Internationalist. Archived from the original on 2019-01-31.
- Morris, Esther (March 2001). "The Missing Vagina Monologue". Sojourner: The Women's Forum. 26 (7). ISSN 0191-8699.

== See also ==
- MRKH
- Intersex
- Intersex rights in the United States
- List of intersex people
