= Accord Alliance =

Organization

- Accord Alliance logo
- Founded: March 2008
- Website: accordalliance.org

Accord Alliance was founded in March 2008 to support a dialogue on intersex patients and their care. They are a hosted project of the Tides Center, an organization that supports non-profit groups. Their stated mission is to promote comprehensive and integrated approaches to care that enhance the health and well-being of people and families affected by disorders of sex development (DSD, which includes some conditions referred to as "intersex"). DSD is a term contested by some activists. Cheryl Chase, founder of the Intersex Society of North America, was a founding member on the advisory board.

== See also ==
- Intersex human rights
- Intersex medical interventions
- Intersex rights in the United States
