= Tiger Devore =

American clinical psychologist and sex therapist

- Born: Howard Devore; 1958 (age 67–68)
- Occupations: Clinical psychologist and sex therapist
- Known for: Intersex activist and educator
- Television: Oprah (1984)
- Website: www.tigerdevorephd.com

Tiger Devore, previously known as Howard Devore and Tiger Howard Devore, is an American clinical psychologist, sex therapist, and spokesperson on intersex issues. He was a member of the defunct Intersex Society of North America. Historian Alice Dreger credits him with starting the work of the intersex movement.

== Early life ==
Tiger Devore was born with severe hypospadias and has experienced over 20 surgeries and four full reconstructions. He says that, "all the surgeries I suffered up to age 19 were unnecessary failures."

Devore has a PhD in clinical psychology and works as a sex therapist, activist and educator with over 30 years of experience in advocacy for intersex people and others who are sexually different from the mainstream. Devore has worked in research clinics at the Johns Hopkins Hospital Medical School, and the Human Sexuality Program at UCLA. During his time at Johns Hopkins University, he worked with the sexologist John Money. He has also worked for NIH as a crisis counsellor and worked with imprisoned sex offenders.

== Activism ==
Alice Dreger describes how Devore, through his work at Johns Hopkins University and as an "out gay man in the 1970s-1980s in America" developed an awareness about "the clinical abuse of sexual minorities". He began to work as an educator and appeared on the Oprah show in 1984, considered to be the first television appearance by an intersex person talking about lived experiences. Dreger describes how Cheryl Chase was referred to him in November 1992, how Devore "taught her about the value of mutual support groups", and how, in 1993, Chase announced the establishment of the Intersex Society of North America (ISNA). Dreger states that:

Devore contributed to ISNA and to the intersex rights movement the outline of what a reformed clinical system would look like: Intersex children would be given preliminary gender assignments as boys and girls (recognizing that all gender assignment is preliminary and does not require surgery); hormonal and surgical interventions would be limited to those that were needed to treat clear and present medical problems, with all elective interventions waiting until patients could consent for themselves; intersex children and adults (and their loved ones) would be provided professional, non-shaming psychosocial support and peer support.

Dreger states that, despite the expertise offered by Devore and Chase at that time, "reporters and producers generally counted Devore and Laurent only as intersex subjects, while I counted as a supposedly objective expert". She states that these reforms still remain to be implemented in 2018. Devore continues to argue in favor of fully informed consent by intersex people to genital surgeries. He states:

I am tired of the perpetration of great harms against infants and babies with perfectly healthy genitals that happen to look different from what the doctors think is standard. Intersex genitalia are not unhealthy, they just look different than some ideal of male or female genitalia. The experiment to reshape intersex genitals early in a child's life has failed. People should have the right to determine if they want reshaped genitals or not, when they are old enough to decide for themselves. That's informed consent; when the person them self has the information necessary to decide if they want a treatment of any kind, or not.

Devore has also argued against the use of disorders of sex development, as a term that is "more scientific," and "more medical," but also more treatable, and more of a stigma. In a statement in November 2015, Devore called for an end to unnecessary surgeries and "recognition of the rights of the child to bodily integrity and self determination", stating "that medicine and the research community continue to co-opt patient advocates in order to silence them by giving us the impression that we had access to influencing medical practice and research."

He is a board member, and former president, of the Hypospadias and Epispadias Association, and a former member of the defunct Intersex Society of North America.

== Selected bibliography ==
- Devore, Tiger (November 21, 2015), Tiger Devore's Statement
- Devore, Howard (1999). "Growing up in the surgical maelstrom". Intersex in the age of ethics. University Publishing Group. pp. 79–82.

== Media ==
Devore has been an educator and media spokesperson on intersex issues since 1984 when he appeared on Oprah. He has appeared in documentaries for Discovery Channel (2000), PBS, National Geographic Channel television, the British Broadcasting Corporation, and the award-winning short movie XXXY by Stanford University. Devore is also interviewed in the 2012 documentary Intersexion. In 2013, he was interviewed by Time Magazine on the then-new German birth certificate laws, and called for a global ban on "normalizing surgeries." Devore was interviewed on the Howard Stern Show on July 28, 1999.
