= Dana Zzyym =

American intersex activist (born 1958)

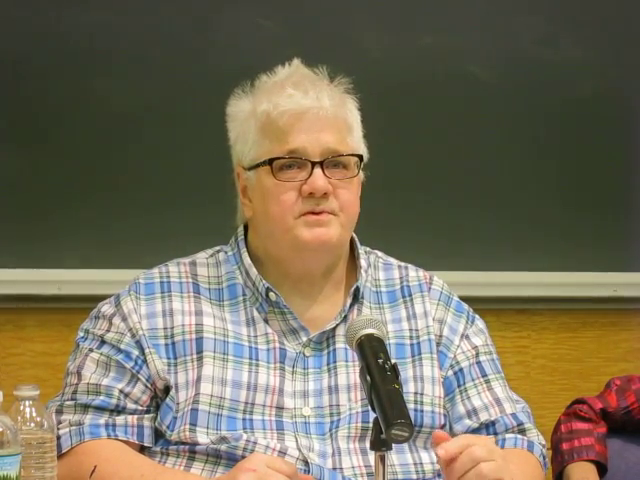
- Zzyym in 2016
- Born: 1958 (age 67–68)
- Occupation: Activist
- Organization: Intersex Campaign for Equality

Dana Alix Zzyym (/zɪm/ ZIM; born 1958) is an intersex activist and veteran of the U.S. Navy. After the culmination of a six-year legal battle, they became the first U.S. citizen to receive an official U.S. passport with an "X" sex/gender marker.

== Early life ==
Zzyym was born in 1958. Zzyym says that their childhood as a military brat made it out of the question for them to be associated with the queer community as a youth due to the prevalence of homophobia in the armed forces. Their parents hid Zzyym's status as intersex from them; Zzyym independently discovered their identity and the surgeries their parents had approved for them after their Navy service. In 1978, Zzyym joined the Navy as a machinist's mate.

== Activism ==
Zzyym is the associate director of the Intersex Campaign for Equality. They are nonbinary and intersex.

== Legal case ==
Zzyym is the first veteran to seek a non-binary gender U.S. passport, in the lawsuit Zzyym v. Blinken (formerly Zzyym v. Pompeo, Zzyym v. Tillerson, and Zzyym v. Kerry). In light of the State Department's continuing refusal to recognize an appropriate gender marker, on June 27, 2017, a federal court granted Lambda Legal's motion to reopen the case. On September 19, 2018, the United States District Court for the District of Colorado enjoined the U.S. Department of State from relying upon its binary-only gender marker policy to withhold the requested passport. In February 2021, the state department stated "To fully integrate the change into its software systems would take approximately 24 months and cost $11 million".

In October 2021, they became the first U.S. citizen to receive an official U.S. passport with an "X" sex/gender marker.

== See also ==
- Intersex people and military service
- Intersex people and military service in the United States
- Elisa Rae Shupe
