= Intersex Campaign for Equality =

American intersex rights organization

- Abbreviation: IC4E
- Formation: February 2011
- Type: NGO
- Purpose: Intersex human rights
- Region served: United States
- Executive Director: Hida Viloria
- Website: intersexequality.com

The Intersex Campaign for Equality (IC4E) is a non-governmental organization that advocates for the human rights of intersex people. It was formerly the US affiliate of Organisation Intersex International.

== History and staff ==
The Intersex Campaign for Equality was founded as an affiliate of Organisation Intersex International in February 2011. The founder and director is author and activist Hida Viloria. Dana Zzyym has been the associate director since February 19, 2015, when intersex activists Dani Lee Harris, Hida Viloria, and Zzyym re-branded the Intersex Campaign for Equality (IC4E). In November 2017, the Campaign announced their departure from Organisation Intersex International. Intersex activist Elder Andrea Vickie Boisseau serves as IC4E's New England Director.

== Mission ==
IC4E aims to campaign for the human rights of intersex people, particularly rights to self-determination and bodily integrity. It also aims to support intersex individuals, and provide information on the actual life experiences of people with intersex variations to professionals working providing services to them, including medical personnel, psychological experts, sexologists, sociologists and academics.

The Intersex Campaign for Equality is a multi-gendered, multi-orientation, multi-racial NGO founded by and for intersex people. The Intersex Campaign for Equality's mission is to attain human rights—particularly the rights to bodily integrity, self-determination, legal recognition, and de-pathologization—for all intersex people regardless of sexual orientation, gender identity, race, ability or class, recognizing that some intersex individuals, particularly those with nonbinary gender identities, remain marginalized even within the intersex community.

== Advocacy ==
IC4E advocates for human rights for intersex people in the United States via personal communication, consulting, public speaking, publishing, and lobbying. The organization also provides peer support, news updates, information, and educational events and lectures. They have lobbied extensively in the press and in print against intersex genital mutilation, aka medically unnecessary "normalizing" genital surgeries and hormone treatments of intersex infants and minors, and against discriminatory regulations for intersex female athletes.

In 2011, founder and director Hida Viloria lobbied the U.S. Secretary of State Hillary Clinton for inclusion of intersex people, as the "I" in "LGBTI", in LGBT anti-discrimination policies.

=== Physical integrity and bodily autonomy ===
Attaining the right to physical integrity and bodily determination through an end to the practice of nonconsensual medically unnecessary surgeries on intersex infants and minors—a.k.a. Intersex Genital Mutilation (IGM)—is one of IC4E's founding goals and a primary focus of our education and advocacy work. In 2012, IC4E called for an end to IGM as participants of the Second International Intersex Forum in Stockholm. In addition, upon suggestion of our participating representative Hida Viloria, Forum participants called for IGM to be framed as human rights issue. This was done in an open letter authored by Viloria signed by participants of the Forum and delivered to United Nations High Commissioner for Human Rights, Navi Pillay. In 2013, Viloria served as the sole American co-organizer of the Third International Intersex Forum in Malta, which culminated in the creation of the Malta declaration (International Intersex Forum), the most widely agreed upon list of human rights demands—including an end to IGM—by the global intersex community.

In addition, IC4E team members have been advocating individually, since for IC4E's founding, for an end to IGM. Southeastern Regional Rep. Dani Lee Harris, of Atlanta, has been educating and advocating for an end to IGM for years via lectures in his Southern Baptist community, and did so in the 2012 intersex documentary Intersexion. Associate Director Dana Zzyym has been advocating against IGM for many years as a college lecturer, and also in the mainstream media, including interviews on ABC NEWS, since filing their groundbreaking lawsuit for a non-binary U.S. passport on Intersex Awareness Day, October 26, 2015, with Lambda Legal as their legal representative. (The case is still pending as of December, 2017.)

Founding E.D. Hida Viloria has been advocating against IGM since 1996 via numerous television, film and radio interviews. They have also published extensively on the issue, discussing opposition to IGM in the majority of her numerous published essays, as well as specifically in essays in the Narrative Inquiry in Bioethics, The Advocate, and CNN.com. In addition, Viloria provided expert testimony, in Spanish, in 2013 for the Spanish language television court show Caso Cerrado, and was interviewed on BBC World Service radio regarding the ground-breaking U.S. lawsuit by the parents of an intersex child against the doctors that operated on him as an infant. Ending IGM is a primary topic of their memoir, Born Both: An Intersex Life, the first book by an openly intersex person to be published by a Big Five publishing house, Hachette Book Group, in 2017.

=== Third Gender Identification documents ===
On Intersex Awareness Day, October 26, 2015, Associate Director Dana Zzyym made history by announcing that they, along with their legal representatives from Lambda Legal, the U.S.'s oldest LGBT legal rights organization, are suing the United States Department of State for legal gender recognition on their passport as someone who is neither male nor female. Zzyym was born intersex and identifies as non-binary and is seeking accurate federal gender recognition.

The lawsuit received extensive coverage in national venues such as The Washington Post, The Huffington Post, CNN.com, The New York Times, The Los Angeles Times, and The Advocate, bringing widespread mainstream attention to the existence of, and the need for equal rights for, intersex people.

Articles specifically focusing on intersex birth registrations by Hida Viloria can be found at The Advocate and The Global Herald. In November 2013, Viloria was interviewed regarding Germany's third gender law for intersex infants. Viloria provided an introduction to intersex on Huffington Post Live in November 2013.

=== Access to sport ===
Hida Viloria has experience in advising the International Olympic Committee on intersex perspectives in access to sport. With Spanish hurdler Maria José Martínez-Patiño, Viloria has argued that Olympic sex testing is applied in a way that targets only "butch" women, those who are "masculine looking". On International Human Rights Day 2013, Vilora spoke as director of IC4E at the United Nations event, "Sport Comes Out Against Homophobia".

On Human Rights Day 2013, Viloria spoke at the United Nations, educating about the human rights violations intersex people face and the need for legal protection from discrimination at the event, "Sport Comes Out Against Homophobia".

In addition, in early 2010, before founding the organization, Viloria lobbied the International Olympic Committee (IOC) for equal treatment of intersex female athletes after the gender verification testing of South African track star Caster Semenya. This resulted in Viloria participating, by invitation, at the IOC 's 2010 meeting of experts in Lausanne, Switzerland, where they lobbied that intersex female athletes be allowed to compete as is, without having to undergo unnecessary medical treatments, and that the use of the pathologizing term "disorders of sex development"/DSD to describe these athletes be discontinued.

In 2014, Viloria spoke about discrimination against intersex female athletes on Al Jazeera's The Stream.

=== Media and visibility work ===
Founder and Director Hida Viloria is one of the first individuals in the world to come out publicly as intersex, via numerous television, film and radio interviews beginning in 1996. Viloria's media and visibility work includes appearances on such high-profile television programs as The Oprah Winfrey Show, ABC's 20/20, and The Tyra Banks Show, reaching an estimated 100 million viewers via broadcast and additional YouTube views.

Since founding the organization in 2011, Viloria has published extensively on intersex issues, in publications such as The American Journal of Bioethics, The New York Times, The Daily Beast, The Huffington Post, The Global Herald, and Ms.

In 2015, on October 26, Intersex Awareness Day, IC4E Associate Director Dana Zzyym announced the filing of their groundbreaking lawsuit for a non-binary U.S. passport. The case has garnered widespread attention by the mainstream media, including ABC News, The Washington Post, The Washington Blade, and many others, and is expected to continue to as it develops (case still pending as of December 2017).

In March, 2017, Viloria became the first openly intersex author to be published by one of the Big Five publishers, Hatchette Book Group, with the release of their memoir, Born Both: An Intersex Life. They have subsequently been featured in interviews in Rolling Stone, Psychology Today, and NPR. The memoir has garnered widespread attention by the mainstream media, including praise in the New York Times and The Washington Post, and selections by People Magazine as one of six Best New Books, School Library Journal as one of ten best adult books for teens, and more.

=== Publications ===
On Intersex Awareness Day, October 26, 2012, the organization published the free educational resource Brief Guidelines for Intersex Allies. In May 2013, IC4E published Your Beautiful Child: Information for Parents, a resource of non-stigmatizing information for parents, authored by Viloria, which includes links to unbiased medical studies regarding medically unnecessary surgeries for intersex people, and is being utilized by health care providers around the world.

In 2015, IC4E assisted the United Nations Free & Equal Campaign in drafting their resource, the Intersex Fact Sheet, and in 2016, Viloria's essay, "What's in A Name: Intersex and identity", which calls for a non-stigmatizing, equality based linguistic approach to discussing intersex people, was published in the college curriculum textbook, Queer: A Reader for Writers, by Oxford University Press.

=== International work ===
IC4E has also been heavily involved in the international intersex human rights movement. On Human Rights Day, December 10, 2012, founder and director Hida Viloria spearheaded a global call for human rights by and for intersex people, via the "Open Letter: A Call for the Inclusion of Human Rights for Intersex People", which they authored and delivered to the Office of the United Nations High Commissioner for Human Rights with participants of the 2nd International Intersex Forum in Stockholm signing on in support. The following year, Viloria served as one of three intersex participants chosen by ILGA-Europe to co-organize the third International Intersex Forum, in Malta, which led to the creation of the Malta Declaration, an internationally agreed declaration of the demands and human rights goals of the international intersex community.

== See also ==
- Intersex human rights
- Organisation Intersex International
- Intersex rights in the United States
- Intersex rights by country
