= Intersex Aotearoa =

New Zealand nonprofit organisation

Intersex Aotearoa (Intersex Trust of Aotearoa New Zealand)
- Abbreviation: IA
- Formation: 1996
- Type: Nonprofit
- Legal status: charitable trust
- Purpose: Intersex human rights
- Region served: New Zealand
- Chair: Tu Chapman
- Main organ: Trust Board
- Staff: 5
- Volunteers: 5
- Website: www.intersexaotearoa.org

Intersex Trust of Aotearoa New Zealand is a nonprofit organization based in New Zealand that serves as the national advocacy and peer support organization for intersex people. Operating under the name Intersex Aotearoa, and previously known as Intersex Awareness New Zealand, it is recognized as the peak body representing intersex persons, those with variations of sex characteristics, or Ira Tangata. The organization was founded in 1996 by Mani Mitchell, a prominent intersex activist and advocate.

== Mission ==
Intersex Aotearoa is a charitable trust that works to advance the rights, inclusion, and well-being of intersex people across New Zealand by fostering inclusivity, reducing prejudice, and promoting shared values. Its objectives include building strong relationships between healthcare professionals and intersex activists, empowering intersex voices, and addressing key social issues impacting the intersex community.

== Activities ==
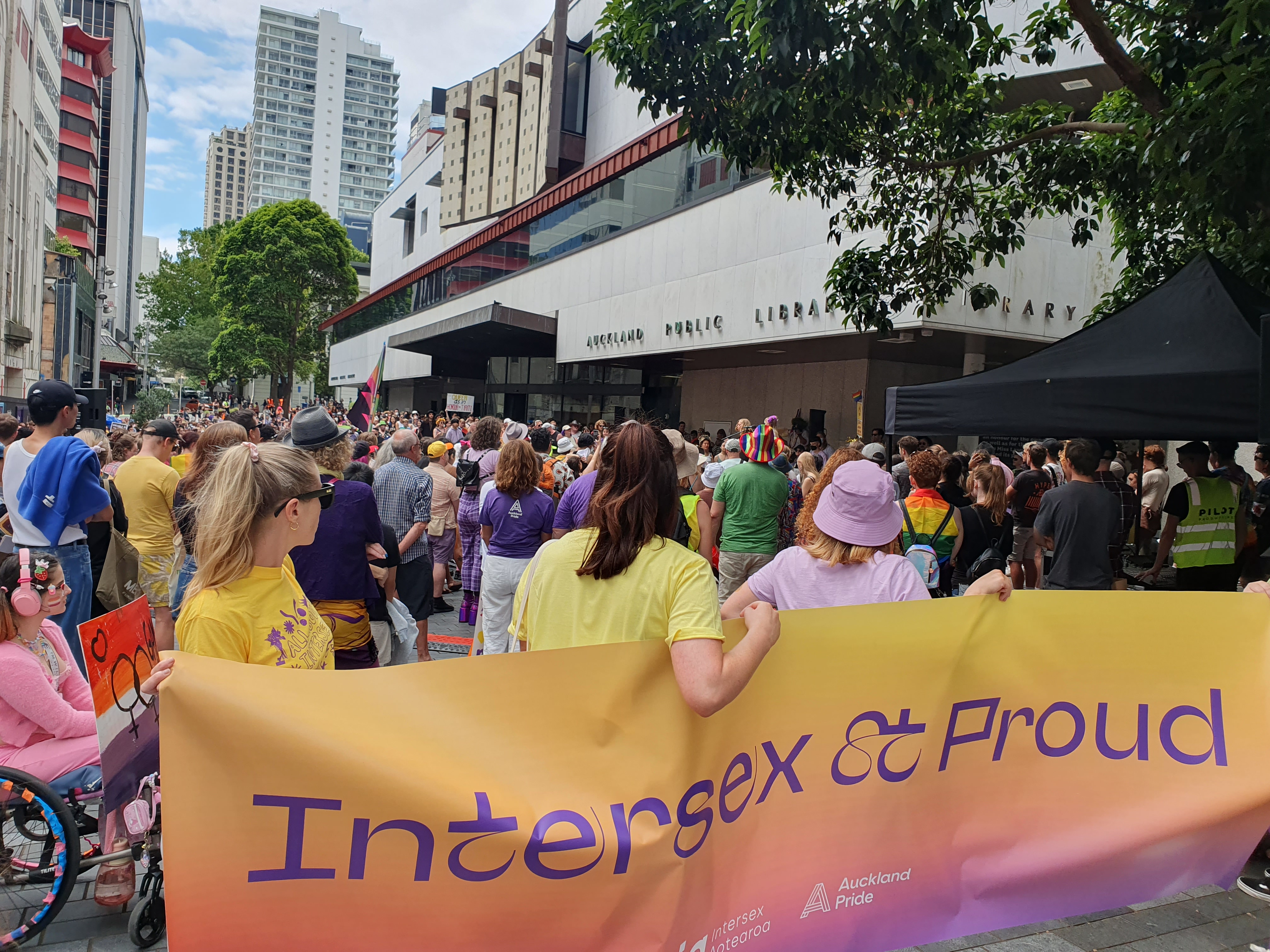
The 2023 Auckland Pride March called for a celebration of Intersex people, in collaboration with Intersex Aotearoa

The Trust works with a range of stakeholders, including nonprofits and healthcare workers to ensure Intersex people, those with variations of sex characteristics, and Ira Tangata are centred in conversations that involve them. Their work is broken into three strategic pou: Systems Change; Education; and Community Building.

=== Systems Change ===
Trust members have participated in, and jointly held, roundtable events with the Human Rights Commission, including on the human rights implications of intersex medical interventions, shame and secrecy. Following a joint round table event with the Human Rights Commission, the Commission proposed to the UN Committee on the Rights of the Child that the New Zealand government enact legal and regulatory safeguards to protect the rights of intersex children, and ensure that children's rights to bodily integrity, autonomy and self-determination are respected. In October 2016, the Committee on the Rights of the Child issued observations on practices in New Zealand, including recommendations to ensure "that no one is subjected to unnecessary medical or surgical treatment during infancy or childhood, guaranteeing the rights of children to bodily integrity, autonomy and self-determination". The recommendations of the Committee on the Rights of the Child have been illustrated by ITANZ and Intersex Youth Aotearoa.

In March 2017, representatives of Intersex Trust Aotearoa New Zealand participated in an Australian and Aotearoa/New Zealand consensus "Darlington Statement" by intersex community organisations and others. The statement calls for legal reform, including the criminalization of deferrable intersex medical interventions on children, an end to legal classification of sex, and improved access to peer support.

=== Education ===
The work done by Intersex Aotearoa in education had been long term. Mani Mitchell, Jelly O'Shea and Board members, including Tu Chapman and Rogena Sterling, have given presentations to a range of audiences, including the National College of Midwives biennial conference and the University of the Third Age. The Trust have supported the filming of award-winning documentary Intersexion (2012).

In 2025 the trust hired a specific Education lead, these sessions are open to all audiences.

Community Building

In 2022 the Trust put significant work into bringing together a Peer Support arm under the work of previous Community and Communications Manager, Jelly O'Shea.

In 2025 the Trust employed a specific peer support lead

=== Other ===
Mitchell co-organised the third International Intersex Forum in Malta, 2013.

== Affiliations ==
Intersex Aotearoa is a member of: ILGA International Lesbian, Gay, Bisexual, Trans and Intersex Association; Rainbow Support Collective

== See also ==
- Intersex human rights
- Intersex rights in New Zealand
