= Cheryl Chase (activist) =

American activist (born 1956)

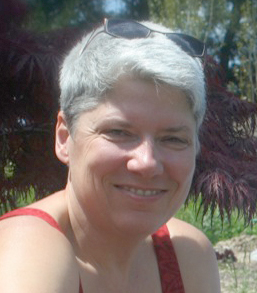
- Born: Brian Sullivan; August 14, 1956 (age 70); New Jersey
- Other name: Bo Laurent
- Education: Massachusetts Institute of Technology (1983); Sonoma State University (2008)
- Occupation: Intersex activist
- Known for: Founding the Intersex Society of North America
- Spouse: Robin Mathias

Bo Laurent, better known by her pseudonym Cheryl Chase (born August 14, 1956), is an American intersex activist and the founder of the Intersex Society of North America. She began using the names Bo Laurent and Cheryl Chase simultaneously in the 1990s and changed her name legally from Bonnie Sullivan to Bo Laurent in 1995.

== Early life ==
Chase was born in New Jersey with ambiguous genitalia that baffled doctors. According to The New York Times, her parents originally named her Brian Sullivan, noting that "Chase is XX, and the reason for her intersex condition has never been fully understood." Other sources state her original name was Charlie, since until recently Chase preferred to use pseudonyms when referring to her early life.

Chase told Salon she was born with "mixed male/female sex organs" and after the discovery of ovaries and a uterus, a clitoridectomy was performed to remove her larger clitoris when she was aged 18 months. Her parents, as advised by doctors, moved to a new town and raised her as a girl, Bonnie Sullivan. Although she had begun speaking before the operation, she fell silent for six months afterwards.

She told Salon that her ovotestis was removed at age 8 (later clarified as "the testicular part of her ovo-testes"). She found out about the clitoridectomy at age 10, and at age 21 succeeded in gaining access to her medical records (some sources say this occurred in her early thirties).

== Education and career ==
Chase graduated from MIT with a B.S. in mathematics in 1983. She then studied Japanese at Harvard Extension School and at the Intensive Summer Language Institute of Middlebury College, which was founded by Congregationalists. In 1985, Chase was working as a graphic designer. She then moved to Japan as a visiting scholar at Hiroshima University. She later joined a computer software firm near Tokyo as co-founder. While in Japan, she also did translation work; "I was good at all the hard stuff, the non-emotional stuff that's considered more masculine," Chase said. Upon return to the United States, Chase began working as an intersex activist. In 2008, Chase received an M.A. in organization development from Sonoma State University.

== Activism ==
Chase had a "nervous breakdown" in her mid-30s. She told Salon she once contemplated committing suicide "in front of the mutilating physician who had rendered her genitalia numb and scarred." When she was 35, Chase returned to the U.S. and badgered her mother for answers, then embarked on a search for a fuller understanding of what she had learned. Chase contacted many academic researchers and people with personal experiences of intersex conditions. In 1993, via a letter to the editor published in The Sciences July/August issue, she founded the now defunct Intersex Society of North America (ISNA) by fiat and asked for people to write to her under her new name, Cheryl Chase, the beginning of the movement to protect the human rights of people born with intersex conditions in the U.S. In the 1990s, she began using the names Bo Laurent and Cheryl Chase simultaneously, sometimes in the same publication. She is the creator of Hermaphrodites Speak! (1995), a 30-minute documentary film in which several intersex people discuss the psychological impact of their conditions and the medical treatment and parenting they received, and the editor of the journal Hermaphrodites with Attitude.

In 1998 Chase wrote an amicus brief for the Colombian constitutional court, which was then considering a ruling on surgery for a six-year-old boy with a micropenis. In 2004, Chase and the ISNA persuaded the San Francisco Human Rights Commission to hold hearings on medical procedures for intersex infants. Chase has published commentaries in medical journals and has criticized feminist writers, including Alice Walker and Katha Pollitt, for not putting intersexuality on the feminist agenda, despite their condemnation of female genital cutting in Africa and elsewhere. ISNA was honored with the International Gay and Lesbian Human Rights Commission's 2000 Felipa de Souza Human Rights Award.

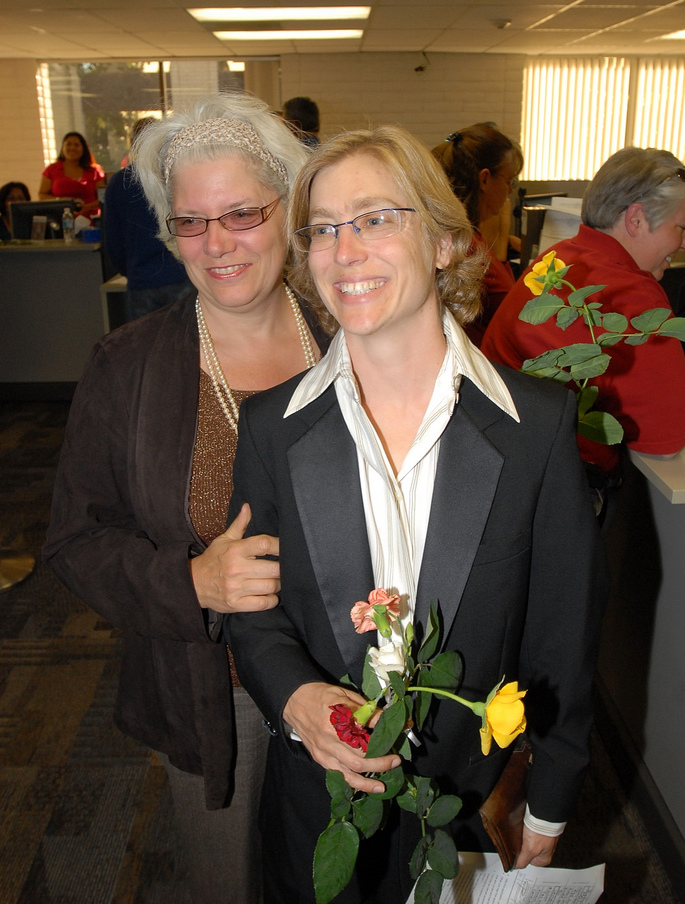
Cheryl Chase and Robin Mathias married in California in 2008.

Chase's activism was a factor in the urology and endocrinology disciplines' reopening of their consideration of intersex conditions. Chase advocates a more complex view of intersexuality: in particular, that difficulties cannot be eliminated by early genital surgery. In August 2006, Pediatrics published a letter signed by 50 international experts, including Chase, titled "Consensus Statement on the Management of Intersex Disorders". The statement, however, does not discourage surgical interventions, but did emphasize caution.

In 2017, Chase took part in the launch of a report by Human Rights Watch and interACT on medically unnecessary surgeries on intersex children, "I Want to Be Like Nature Made Me", based on interviews with intersex persons, families and physicians. The report found that intersex medical interventions persist as default advice from doctors to parents, despite some change in some regions of the U.S. and claims of improved surgical techniques, resulting in an uneven situation where care differs and a lack of standards of care, but paradigms for care are still based on socio-cultural factors including expectations of "normality" and evidence in support of surgeries remains lacking. "Nearly every parent" in the study reported pressure for their children to undergo surgery, and many reported misinformation. The report calls for a ban on "surgical procedures that seek to alter the gonads, genitals, or internal sex organs of children with atypical sex characteristics too young to participate in the decision, when those procedures both carry a meaningful risk of harm and can be safely deferred."

== Personal life ==
Chase has written about being openly lesbian since her 20s. Chase married her partner of five years, Robin Mathias, in San Francisco in 2004. They live on a hobby farm in Sonoma and remarried in 2008 following the In re Marriage Cases.

== See also ==
- Intersex rights in the United States
