= Organisation Intersex International =

Global intersex rights and support group

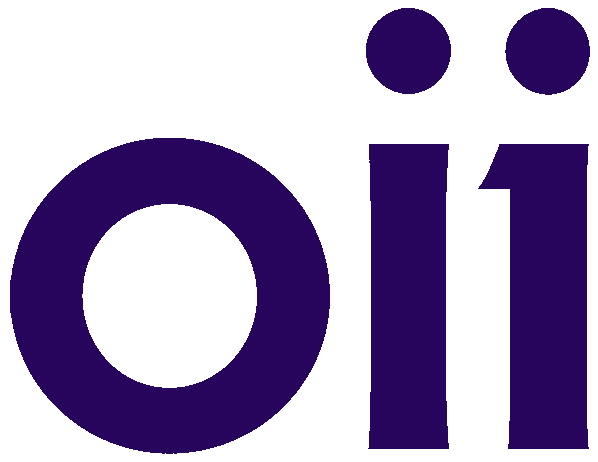
- Logo for OII UK. Similar logos are used for OII in other countries (but the international organisation uses a different logo)
- Abbreviation: OII
- Formation: 2003
- Type: NGO
- Purpose: Intersex human rights
- Region served: worldwide
- Website: oiiinternational.com

The Organisation Intersex International (OII) is a global advocacy and support group for people with intersex traits. According to Milton Diamond, it is the world's largest organization of intersex persons. A decentralised network, OII was founded in 2003 by Curtis Hinkle and Sarita Vincent Guillot. Upon Hinkle's retirement, American intersex activist Hida Viloria served as Chairperson/President elect from April 2011 through November 2017, when they resigned in order to focus on OII's American affiliate, OII-USA's transition into the independent American non-profit, the Intersex Campaign for Equality.

== Mission ==
OII was established to give voice to intersex people, including those speaking languages other than just English, for people born with bodies which have atypical sexual characteristics such as gonads, chromosomes, and/or genitals. OII acknowledges intersex as a normal human biological variation, and rejects the terminology of disorder, as in DSD/Disorders of Sex Development, utilized by some other intersex groups, as well as the sexualization of intersex (as in Intersexuality). They acknowledge intersex people's own distinct sexuality, as people who may identify as gay, lesbian, bisexual, queer, trans, straight, or other, in alliance with other members of the LGBTI population.

Sociologist Georgiann Davis describes OII and (the now defunct) Intersex Society of North America as "activist organisations". The objective of OII is to achieve equality and human rights for intersex people, and end human rights violations against them, particularly the practice of non-consensual genital surgeries on infants and minors. The ethos of the group is that people will hold different views as appropriate to the individual; this often entails treating as optional socially and medically constructed categories such as binary genders and sexual identifications; the identity human being understood as the fundamental identity.

== Affiliates ==
Affiliates include organisations in Chinese, French and Spanish-speaking regions, Australia, and Europe. In November 2017, the former US affiliate, OII-USA, announced that it had left OII. They include:

=== Collectif intersexe activiste - OII France ===
In 2016, OII France was established as Collectif intersexes et allié.e.s by Loé Petit and Lysandre Nury.

=== InterAction Suisse ===
In 2017, InterAction Suisse was established in Switzerland by Audrey Aegerter and Deborah Abate.

=== Intersex Human Rights Australia ===
Intersex Human Rights Australia, formerly known as OII Australia, is a charitable company that has achieved notable contributions to national health and human rights policies, including intersex inclusion in anti-discrimination legislation, gender recognition, healthcare access, and contributions to a Senate of Australia report on the Involuntary or coerced sterilisation of intersex people in Australia. Notable members include co-chairs Morgan Carpenter and Tony Briffa, and retired president Gina Wilson.

=== Intersex Russia ===
OII Russia also known as Intersex Russia (Russian: Интерсекс Россия), based in Moscow, Russia was founded in 2017. Notable representatives include Irene Kuzemko, one of the very few open intersex persons in Russia and a co-founder of OII Russia.

=== Intersex South Africa ===
Founded by Sally Gross, Intersex South Africa is an autonomous affiliated organisation. Advocacy work by Sally Gross led to the first recognition of intersex in law in any country in the world.

=== Oii-Chinese ===
Oii-Chinese (國際陰陽人組織 — 中文版) aims to end "normalising" surgeries on intersex children, promote awareness of intersex issues, and improve government recognition of gender. Chiu says that surgical "normalisation" practices began in Taiwan in 1953. As part of this mission, founder Hiker Chiu started a "free hugs with intersex" campaign at Taipei's LGBT Pride Parade in 2010. The organisation also gives lectures and lobbies government.

=== OII Europe ===
Founded in 2012 at the Second International Intersex Forum, OII Europe is the first European intersex NGO. Along with ILGA-Europe, the organisation contributed to Resolution 1952 (2013) of the Council of Europe Parliamentary Assembly, on Children's Right to Physical Integrity, adopted in October 2013. Notable representatives include executive director Dan Christian Ghattas, co-chairs Kitty Anderson and Miriam van der Have, and Kristian Ranđelović.

=== OII-Francophonie ===
OII-Francophonie was the original OII, based in Quebec and Paris, from where the French title Organisation Intersex International derived, and founded by Curtis Hinckle, Andre Lorek and Vincent Guillot (amongst others) between 2003 and 2004. OII-Canada was the first OII-affiliate to become legally incorporated in 2004. OII-Francophonie hosted a summer school in Paris in 2006, with representatives from Canada, France, Belgium and the UK including Vincent Guillot, Cynthia Krauss and Paula Machado.

=== OII Germany ===
OII Germany, also known as Internationale Vereinigung Intergeschlechtlicher Menschen, participates in national and European action promoting human rights and bodily autonomy. In September 2013, the Heinrich Böll Foundation published Human Rights between the Sexes, an analysis of the human rights of intersex people in 12 countries, written by Dan Christian Ghattas of OII-Germany.

=== OII-UK ===
OII-UK was established between 2004 and 2005 by Tina Livingstone, Michelle O'Brien and Sophia Siedlberg. OII-UK was active in representing the interests of intersex people at UK and European conferences, meetings and forums between 2005 and 2010. After a brief hiatus from 2010 due to members stepping down for health or migration reasons, OII-UK was again active, led by Leslie Jaye.

== Association with Intersex Day of Remembrance ==
Intersex Day of Remembrance, also known as Intersex Solidarity Day, is an internationally observed civil awareness day designed to highlight issues faced by intersex people, occurring annually on 8 November. The event appears to have begun on November 8, 2005, as Intersex Solidarity Day, following an invitation issued by Joëlle-Circé Laramée, then Canadian spokeswoman for OII. The Organisation invited organisations and groups and individuals to show solidarity by marking the life of Herculine Barbin, or discussing intersex genital mutilation, "the violence of the binary sex and gender system" and/or "the sexism implicit within the binary construct of sex and gender". Herculine Barbin was a French intersex person; her memoirs were published by Michel Foucault in Herculine Barbin: Being the Recently Discovered Memoirs of a Nineteenth-century French Hermaphrodite.

== See also ==
- Intersex human rights
- Intersex civil society organizations
