= Intersex human rights =

Human rights for intersex people

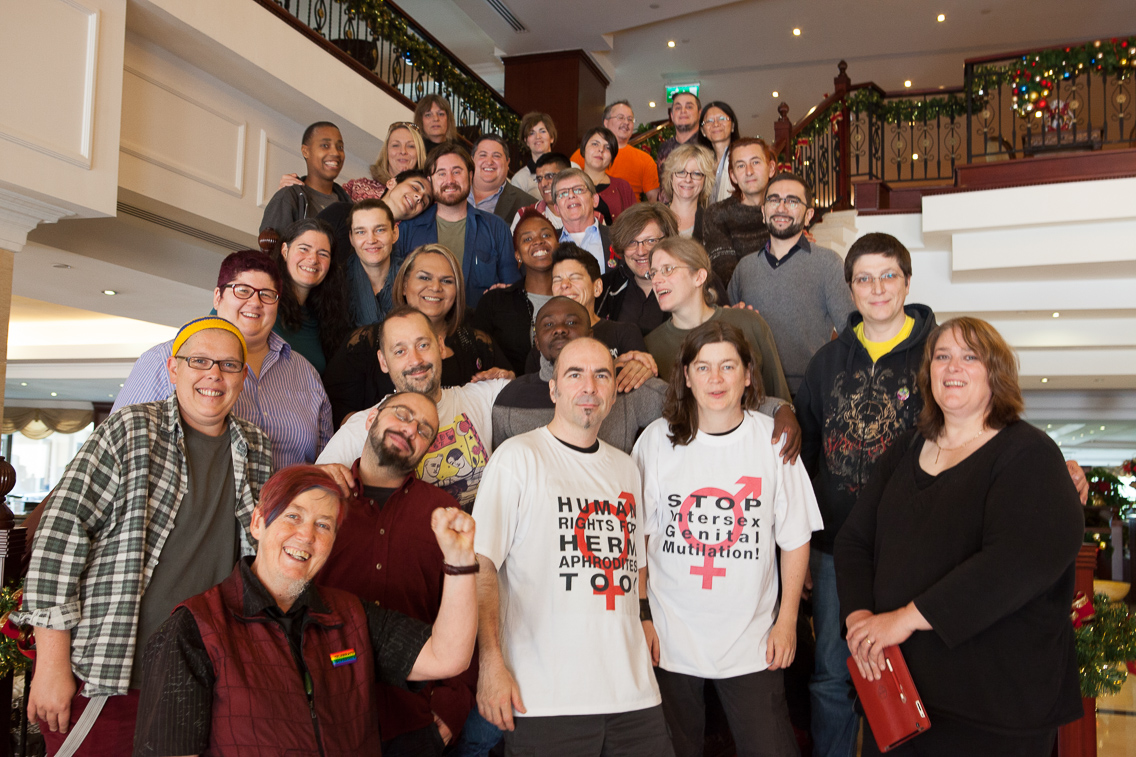
Participants at the third International Intersex Forum, Malta, in December 2013

Intersex people are born with sex characteristics, such as chromosomes, gonads, or genitals, that, according to the UN Office of the High Commissioner for Human Rights, "do not fit typical binary notions of male or female bodies."

Intersex persons often face stigmatisation and discrimination from birth, particularly when an intersex variation is visible. In some countries this may include infanticide, abandonment and the stigmatization of families. Mothers in East Africa may be accused of witchcraft, and the birth of an intersex child may be described as a curse.

Intersex infants and children particularly those born with visibly ambiguous genitalia are often subjected to surgical and/or hormonal interventions intended to align their bodies with socially accepted male or female characteristics. These procedures are highly controversial, as there is no conclusive evidence that they lead to positive psychological or physical outcomes. Moreover, while infertility in some intersex individuals is linked to specific biological conditions, these interventions themselves can cause irreversible infertility for individuals who might otherwise have had functional reproductive capacity. These issues are recognized as human rights abuses, with statements from UN agencies, the Australian parliament, and German and Swiss ethics institutions. Intersex organizations have also issued joint statements over several years, including the Malta declaration by the third International Intersex Forum.

Implementation of human rights protections in legislation and regulation has progressed more slowly. In 2011, Christiane Völling won the first successful case brought against a surgeon for non-consensual surgical intervention. In 2015, the Council of Europe recognized for the first time a right for intersex persons to not undergo sex assignment treatment. In April 2015, Malta became the first country to outlaw nonconsensual medical interventions to modify sex anatomy, including that of intersex people.

Other human rights and legal issues include the right to life, protection from discrimination, standing to file in law and compensation, access to information, and legal recognition. Few countries so far protect intersex people from discrimination.

== Intersex and human rights ==
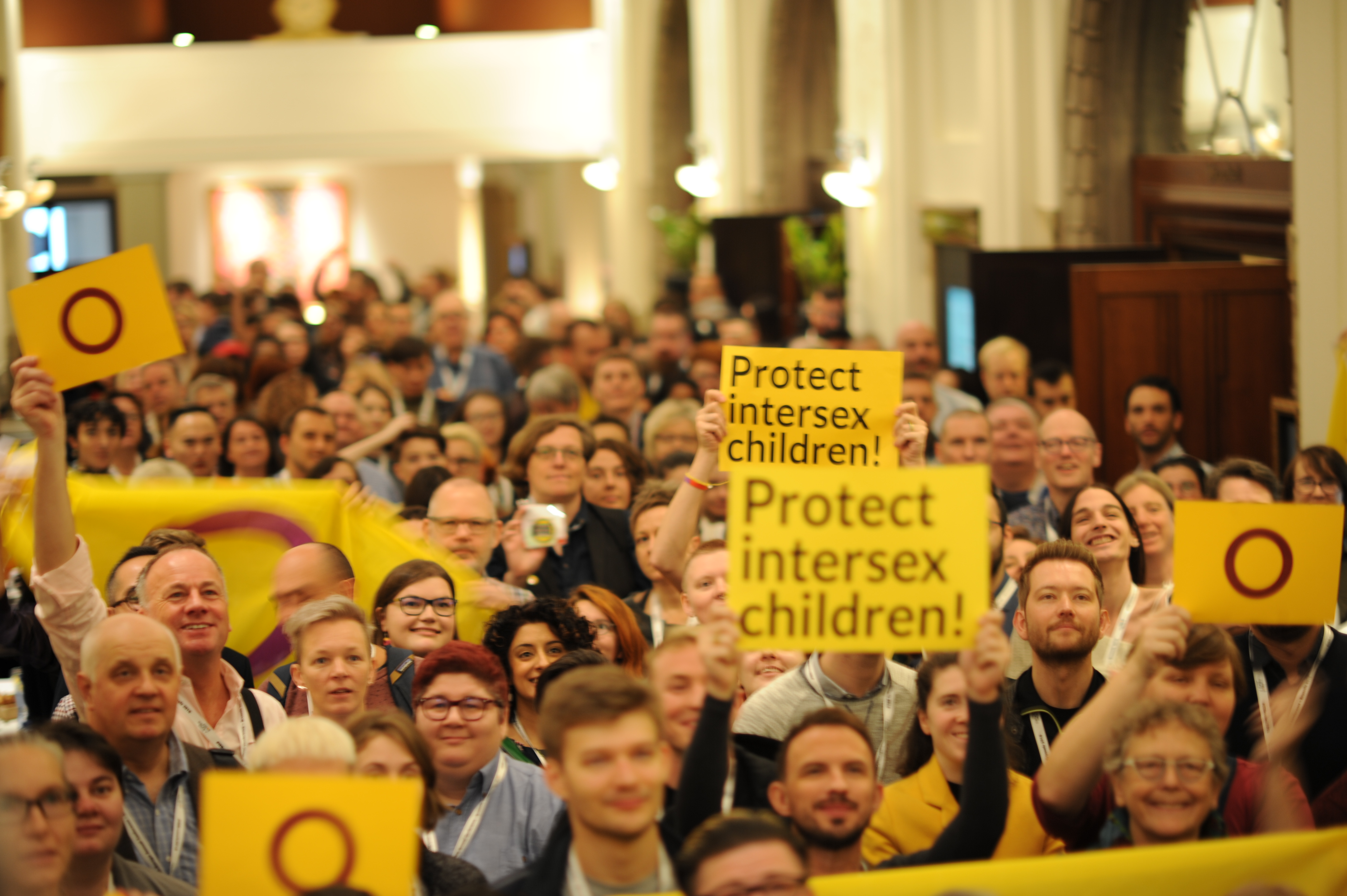
ILGA conference 2018, group photo to mark Intersex Awareness Day

Research indicates a growing consensus that diverse intersex bodies are normal—if relatively rare—forms of human biology, and human rights institutions are placing increasing scrutiny on medical practices and issues of discrimination against intersex people. A 2013 first international pilot study. Human Rights between the Sexes, by Dan Christian Ghattas, found that intersex people are discriminated against worldwide:

Intersex individuals are considered individuals with a "disorder" in all areas in which Western medicine prevails. They are more or less obviously treated as sick or "abnormal", depending on the respective society.

The Council of Europe highlights several areas of concern:

- Equal right to life and prevention of medical treatments without informed consent including treatments considered unnecessary;
- Removal of Intersex as a curable medical condition but one which can have medical treatments with informed consent
- Equal treatment under the law; including specific legal provision similar to other classes covered;
- Access to information, medical records, peer and other counselling and support;
- Self-determination in gender recognition, through expeditious access to official documents.

=== Relationship between Intersex and LGBT ===
Multiple organizations have highlighted appeals to LGBT rights recognition that fail to address the issue of unnecessary "normalising" treatments on intersex children, using the portmanteau term "pinkwashing". In June 2016, Organisation Intersex International Australia pointed to contradictory statements by Australian governments, suggesting that the dignity and rights of LGBTI (LGBT and intersex) people are recognized while, at the same time, harmful practices on intersex children continue.

In August 2016, Zwischengeschlecht described actions to promote equality or civil status legislation without action on banning "intersex genital mutilations" as a form of "pinkwashing". The organization has previously highlighted evasive government statements to UN Treaty Bodies that conflate intersex, transgender and LGBT issues, instead of addressing harmful practices on infants.

== Physical integrity and bodily autonomy ==
Legal prohibition of non-consensual medical interventions Regulatory suspension or limitation of harmful practices Legal prohibition in at least one state/province Physical integrity and bodily autonomy on intersex not legislated

Intersex people face stigmatisation and discrimination from birth. In some countries, particularly in Africa and Asia, this may include infanticide, abandonment and the stigmatization of families. Mothers in east Africa may be accused of witchcraft, and the birth of an intersex child may be described as a curse. Abandonments and infanticides have been reported in Uganda, Kenya, south Asia, and China. In 2015, it was reported that an intersex Kenyan adolescent, Muhadh Ishmael, was mutilated and later died. He had previously been described as a curse on his family.

Non-consensual medical interventions to modify the sex characteristics of intersex people take place in all countries where the human rights of intersex people have been explored. Such interventions have been criticized by the World Health Organization, other UN bodies such as the Office of the High Commissioner for Human Rights, and an increasing number of regional and national institutions. In low and middle income countries, the cost of healthcare may limit access to necessary medical treatment at the same time that other individuals experience coercive medical interventions.

Several rights have been stated as affected by stigmatization and coercive medical interventions on minors:

- the right to life.
- the right to privacy, including a right to personal autonomy or self-determination regarding medical treatment.
- prohibitions against torture and other cruel, inhuman and degrading treatment.
- a right to physical integrity and/or bodily autonomy.
- additionally, the best interests of the child may not be served by surgeries aimed at familial and social integration.

=== Human rights reports ===
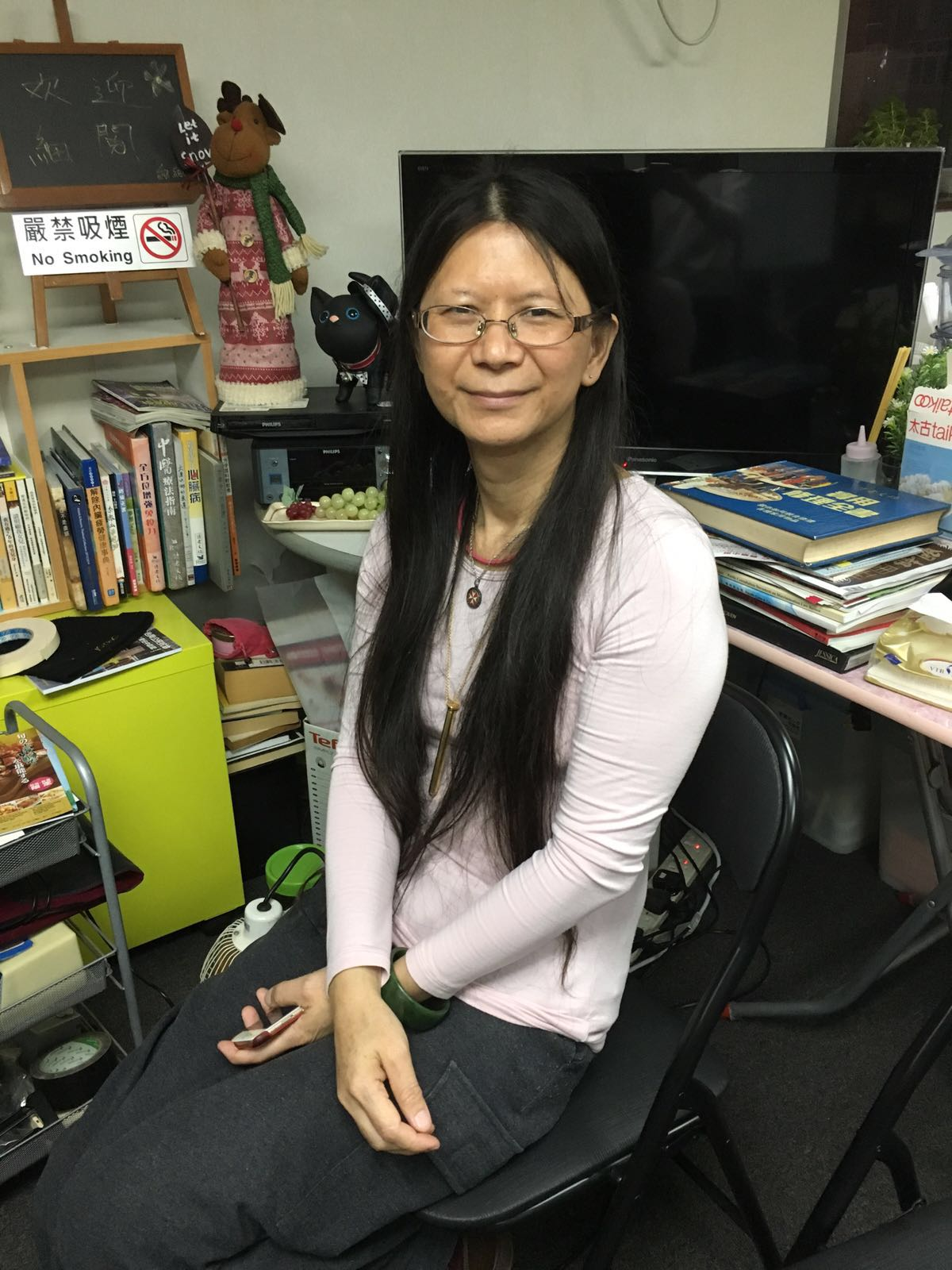
Hong Kong intersex activist Small Luk

In recent years, Intersex rights have been the subject of reports by several national and international institutions. These include the Swiss National Advisory Commission on Biomedical Ethics (2012), the UN special rapporteur on torture and other cruel, inhuman or degrading treatment or punishment (2013), and the Australian Senate (2013). In 2015 the Council of Europe, the United Nations Office of the United Nations High Commissioner for Human Rights and the World Health Organization also addressed the issue. In April 2015, Malta became the first country to outlaw coercive medical interventions. In the same year, the Council of Europe became the first institution to state that intersex people have the right not to undergo sex affirmation interventions.

For Intersex Awareness Day, October 26, UN experts including the Committee against Torture, the Committee on the Rights of the Child and the Committee on the Rights of Persons with Disabilities, along with the Council of Europe Commissioner for Human Rights, the Inter-American Commission on Human Rights and United Nations Special Rapporteurs called for an urgent end to human rights violations against intersex persons, including in medical settings. The experts also called for the investigation of alleged human rights abuses, the ability to file claims for compensation, and the implementation of anti-discrimination measures:

In countries around the world, intersex infants, children and adolescents are subjected to medically unnecessary surgeries, hormonal treatments and other procedures in an attempt to forcibly change their appearance to be in line with societal expectations about female and male bodies. When, as is frequently the case, these procedures are performed without the full, free and informed consent of the person concerned, they amount to violations of fundamental human rights... States must, as a matter of urgency, prohibit medically unnecessary surgery and procedures on intersex children. They must uphold the autonomy of intersex adults and children and their rights to health, to physical and mental integrity, to live free from violence and harmful practices and to be free from torture and ill-treatment. Intersex children and their parents should be provided with support and counselling, including from peers.

In 2017, the human rights non-governmental organizations Amnesty International and Human Rights Watch published major reports on the rights of children with intersex conditions.

=== Constitutional Court of Colombia ===
Although not many cases of children with intersex conditions are available, a case taken to the Constitutional Court of Colombia led to changes in their treatment. The case restricted the power of doctors and parents to decide surgical procedures on children's ambiguous genitalia after the age of five, while continuing to permit interventions on younger children. Due to the decision of the Constitutional Court of Colombia on Case 1 Part 1 (SU-337 of 1999), doctors are obliged to inform parents on all the aspects of the intersex child. Parents can only consent to surgery if they have received accurate information, and cannot give consent after the child reaches the age of five. By then the child will have, supposedly, realized their gender identity. The court case led to the setting of legal guidelines for doctors' surgical practice on intersex children.

=== Maltese legislation ===
In April 2015, Malta became the first country to outlaw non-consensual medical interventions in a Gender Identity Gender Expression and Sex Characteristics Act. The Act recognizes a right to bodily integrity and physical autonomy, explicitly prohibiting modifications to children's sex characteristics for social factors:

14. (1) It shall be unlawful for medical practitioners or other professionals to conduct any sex assignment treatment and/or surgical intervention on the sex characteristics of a minor which treatment and/or intervention can be deferred until the person to be treated can provide informed consent: Provided that such sex assignment treatment and/or surgical intervention on the sex characteristics of the minor shall be conducted if the minor gives informed consent through the person exercising parental authority or the tutor of the minor. (2) In exceptional circumstances treatment may be effected once agreement is reached between the Interdisciplinary Team and the persons exercising parental authority or tutor of the minor who is still unable to provide consent: Provided that medical intervention which is driven by social factors without the consent of the minor, will be in violation of this Act.

The Act was widely welcomed by civil society organizations.

=== Chilean regulations ===
In November 2023, through Circular No. 15 of the Ministry of Health, unnecessary and non-consensual surgeries, procedures or medical treatments on intersex newborns, children and adolescents are prohibited.

In January 2016, the Ministry of Health of Chile ordered through Circular No. 18 the suspension of unnecessary normalization treatments for intersex children, including irreversible surgery, until they reach an age when they can make decisions on their own. The regulations were superseded in August 2016 by Circular No. 07. Circulars 18/2015 and 07/2016 were annulled by Circular 15/2023.

=== Indian State of Tamil Nadu ===
On 22 April 2019 the Madras High Court (Madurai Bench) passed a landmark judgment and issued direction to ban Sex-Selective Surgeries on Intersex Infants based on the works of Gopi Shankar Madurai. On August 13, 2019 the Government of Tamil Nadu, India has issued a Government Order to ban non-necessary surgeries on the sex characteristics of babies and children in the Indian state of Tamil Nadu with 77.8 million people, this regulation is exempted in the case of life-threatening situations.

=== Legal protections in Germany 2021 ===
A law that provides for a general ban on operations in children and adolescents with 'variants of gender development' ('Varianten der Geschlechtsentwicklung') was passed in the German parliament on March 25, 2021. According to a report in the Deutsches Ärzteblatt, the law is intended to strengthen the self-determined decision-making of children and adolescents and avoid possible damage to their health. Surgical changes to gender characteristics should only take place - even with the consent of the parents - if the operation cannot be postponed until age 14. The Federal Chamber of Psychotherapists requires the mandatory participation of a counsellor with experience on intersex in an assessment before a possible intervention. While supportive of progress, the law that was finally passed was also criticized by the Organisation Intersex International (OII) Germany, OII Europe, and Intergeschlechtliche Menschen, because of the existence of exceptions. After the ban, one report estimated that 1900 unnecessary surgeries were still performed annually in Germany. Parents avoided having their children declared intersex to exploit a loophole in the law.

=== Intersex Persons' Reality in Nigeria as of 2025 ===
Intersex people in Nigeria face widespread discrimination, social stigma, and medical mistreatment, including non-consensual surgeries and a lack of access to appropriate healthcare. Deep-rooted cultural and religious norms contribute to secrecy, exclusion from education and employment, and legal invisibility.

Obioma Chukwuike, founder of Intersex Nigeria, is leading national advocacy against non-consensual medical interventions and for the inclusion of intersex people in health policy frameworks.

== Right to life ==
Preimplantation genetic diagnosis (PGD or PIGD) refers to genetic testing of embryos prior to implantation (as a form of embryo profiling), and sometimes even of oocytes prior to fertilization. PGD is considered in a similar fashion to prenatal diagnosis. When used to screen for a specific genetic condition, the method makes it highly likely that the baby will be free of the condition under consideration. PGD thus is an adjunct to assisted reproductive technology, and requires in vitro fertilization (IVF) to obtain oocytes or embryos for evaluation. The technology allows discrimination against those with intersex traits.

Georgiann Davis argues that such discrimination fails to recognize that many people with intersex traits lead full and happy lives. Morgan Carpenter highlights the appearance of several intersex variations in a list by the UK Human Fertilisation and Embryology Authority of "serious" "genetic conditions" that may be de-selected, including 5 alpha reductase deficiency and androgen insensitivity syndrome, traits evident in elite women athletes and "the world's first openly intersex mayor". Organisation Intersex International Australia has called for the Australian National Health and Medical Research Council to prohibit such interventions, noting a "close entanglement of intersex status, gender identity and sexual orientation in social understandings of sex and gender norms, and in medical and medical sociology literature".

In 2015, the Council of Europe published an Issue Paper on Human rights and intersex people, remarking:

Intersex people's right to life can be violated in discriminatory "sex selection" and "preimplantation genetic diagnosis, other forms of testing, and selection for particular characteristics". Such de-selection or selective abortions are incompatible with ethics and human rights standards due to the discrimination perpetrated against intersex people on the basis of their sex characteristics.

== Protection from discrimination ==
Explicit protection on grounds of sex characteristics (Bosnia and Herzegovina, Finland, Greece, Serbia, Malta, Portugal, Norway, Iceland, the Netherlands, Montenegro) Explicit protection on grounds of intersex status (Australia, Jersey) Explicit protection on grounds of intersex within attribute of sex (South Africa, Germany) No explicit protection on grounds

A handful of jurisdictions so far provide explicit protection from discrimination for intersex people. South Africa was the first country to explicitly add intersex to legislation, as part of the attribute of "sex". Australia was the first country to add an independent attribute, of "intersex status". Malta was the first to adopt a broader framework of "sex characteristics, through legislation that also ended modifications to the sex characteristics of minors undertaken for social and cultural reasons. Bosnia-Herzegovina listed as "sex characteristics" Greece prohibits discrimination and hate crimes based on "sex characteristics", since 24 December 2015. Since 2021, Serbia also prohibits discrimination based on "sex characteristics". Since 2022, Chile bans discrimination based on "sex characteristics" under Law 21,430.

=== Education ===
An Australian survey of 272 persons born with atypical sex characteristics, published in 2016, found that 18% of respondents (compared to an Australian average of 2%) failed to complete secondary school, with early school leaving coincident with pubertal medical interventions, bullying and other factors.

=== Employment ===
A 2015 Australian survey of people born with atypical sex characteristics found high levels of poverty, in addition to very high levels of early school leaving, and higher than average rates of disability. An Employers guide to intersex inclusion published by Pride in Diversity and Organisation Intersex International Australia also discloses cases of discrimination in employment.

=== Healthcare ===
Discrimination protection intersects with involuntary and coercive medical treatment. Maltese protections on grounds of sex characteristics provides explicit protection against unnecessary and harmful modifications to the sex characteristics of children.

In May 2016, the United States Department of Health and Human Services issued a statement explaining Section 1557 of the Affordable Care Act stating that the Act prohibits "discrimination on the basis of intersex traits or atypical sex characteristics" in publicly funded healthcare, as part of a prohibition of discrimination "on the basis of sex".

=== Sport ===
In 2013, it was disclosed in a medical journal that four unnamed elite female athletes from developing countries were subjected to gonadectomies (sterilization) and partial clitoridectomies (female genital mutilation) after testosterone testing revealed that they had an intersex condition. Testosterone testing was introduced in the wake of the Caster Semenya case, of a South African runner subjected to testing due to her appearance and vigor. There is no evidence that innate hyperandrogenism in elite women athletes confers an advantage in sport. While Australia protects intersex persons from discrimination, the Act contains an exemption in sport.

== Remedies and compensation claims ==
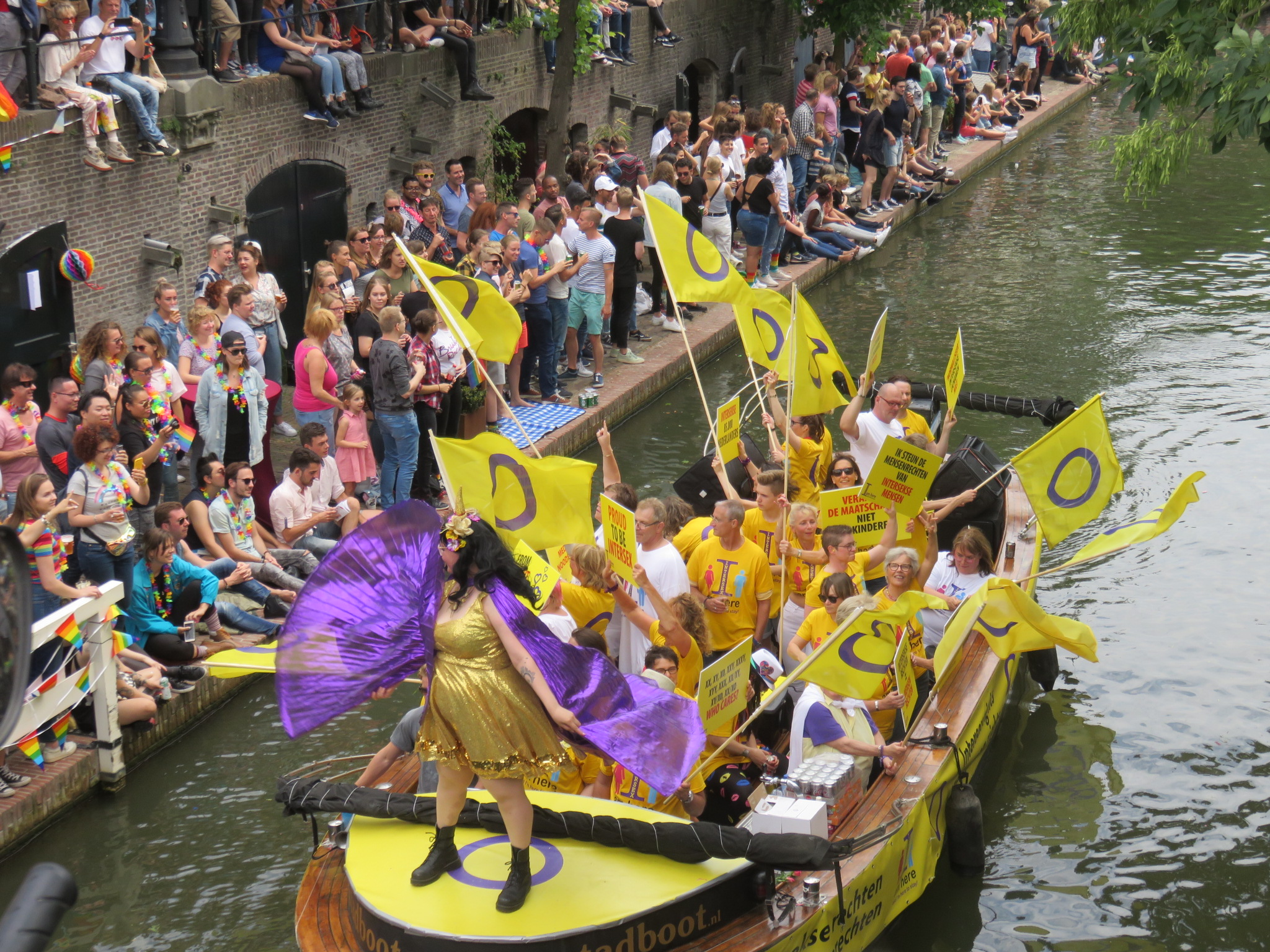
Intersex activists on a boat at Utrecht Canal Pride on June 16, 2018

Compensation claims have been made in a limited number of legal cases.

=== Christiane Völling case, Germany ===
In Germany in 2011, Christiane Völling was successful in a case against her medical treatment. The surgeon was ordered to pay €100,000 in compensatory damages after a legal battle that began in 2007, thirty years after the removal of her reproductive organs.

=== Benjamín-Maricarmen case, Chile ===
On August 12, 2005, the mother of a child, Benjamín, filed a lawsuit against the Maule Health Service after the child's male gonads and reproductive system were removed without informing the parents of the nature of the surgery. The child had been raised as a girl. The claim for compensatory damages was initiated in the Fourth Court of Letters of Talca, and ended up in the Supreme Court of Chile. On November 14, 2012, the Court sentenced the Maule Health Service for "lack of service" and to pay compensation of 100 million pesos for moral and psychological damages caused to Benjamín, and another 5 million for each of the parents.

=== M.C. v. Aaronson case, US ===
In the United States the M.C. v. Aaronson case, advanced by interACT with the Southern Poverty Law Center, was brought before the courts in 2013. In 2015, the Court of Appeals for the Fourth Circuit dismissed the case, stating that, "it did not "mean to diminish the severe harm that M.C. claims to have suffered" but that a reasonable official in 2006 did not have fair warning from then-existing precedent that performing sex assignment surgery on sixteen-month-old M.C. violated a clearly established constitutional right." In July 2017, it was reported that the case had been settled out of court by the Medical University of South Carolina for $440,000, without admission of liability.

=== Michaela Raab case, Germany ===
In 2015, Michaela Raab filed suit against doctors in Nuremberg, Germany, for failing to properly advise her. Doctors stated that they "were only acting according to the norms of the time - which sought to protect patients against the psychosocial effects of learning the full truth about their chromosomes." On 17 December 2015, the Nuremberg State Court ruled that the University of Erlangen-Nuremberg Clinic pay damages and compensation.

== Access to information ==
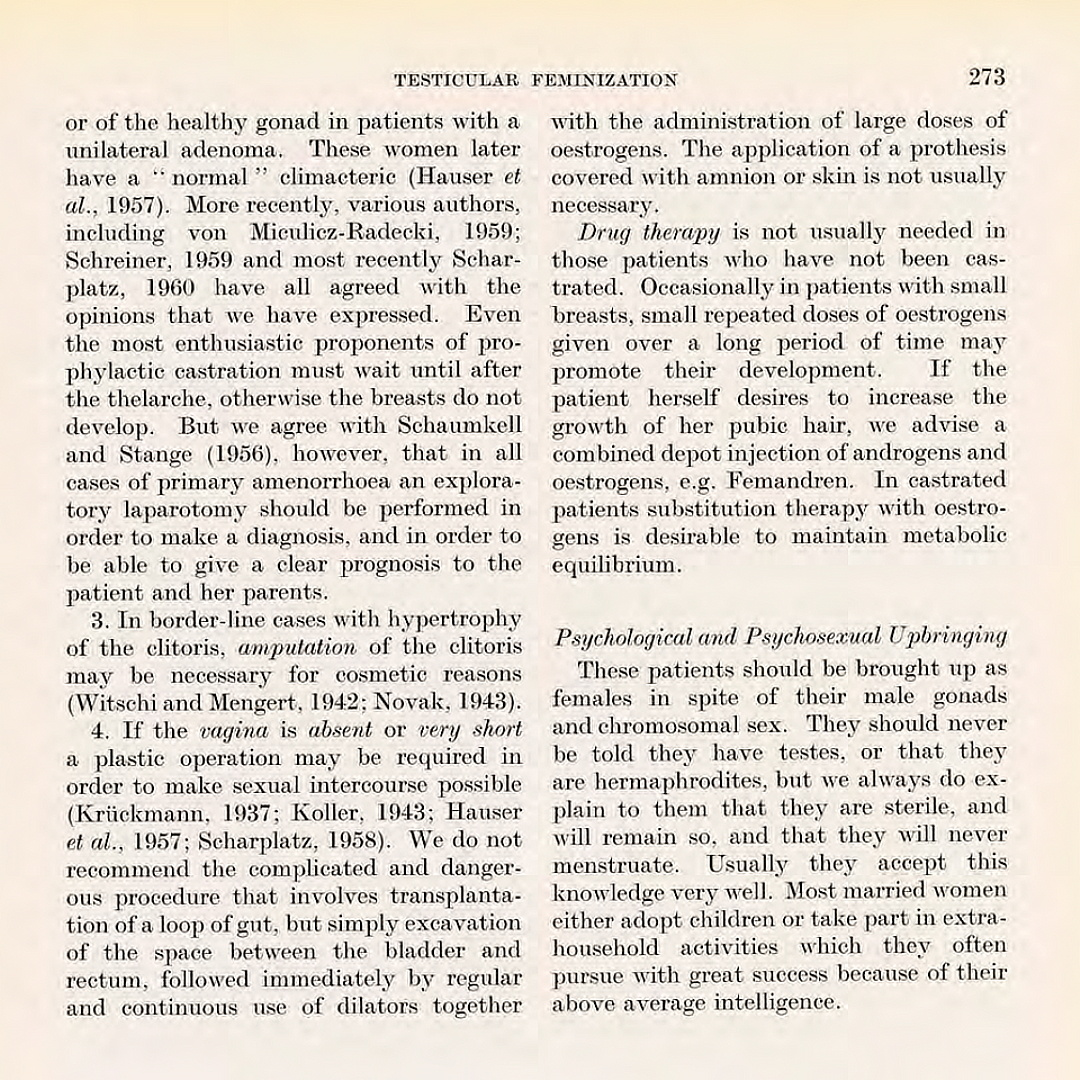
"They should never be told ... " Licence to Lie - Androgen insensitivity syndrome treatment standards in 1963

With the rise of modern medical science in Western societies, many intersex people with ambiguous external genitalia have had their genitalia surgically modified to resemble either female or male genitals. Surgeons pinpointed the birth of intersex babies as a "social emergency". A secrecy-based model was also adopted, in the belief that this was necessary to ensure "normal" physical and psychosocial development. Disclosure also included telling people that they would never meet anyone else with the same condition. Access to medical records has also historically been challenging. Yet the ability to provide free, informed consent depends on the availability of information.

The Council of Europe and World Health Organization acknowledge the necessity for improvements in information provision, including access to medical records.

Some intersex organizations claim that secrecy-based models have been perpetuated by a shift in clinical language to disorders of sex development. Morgan Carpenter of Organisation Intersex International Australia quotes the work of Miranda Fricker on "hermeneutical injustice" where, despite new legal protections from discrimination on grounds of intersex status, "someone with lived experience is unable to even make sense of their own social experiences" due to the deployment of clinical language and "no words to name the experience".

== Legal recognition ==
According to the Asia Pacific Forum of National Human Rights Institutions, few countries have provided for the legal recognition of intersex people. The Forum states that the legal recognition of intersex people is:

- firstly about access to the same rights as other men and women, when assigned male or female;
- secondly it is about access to administrative corrections to legal documents when an original sex assignment is not appropriate; and
- thirdly, while opt in schemes may help some individuals, legal recognition is not about the creation of a third sex or gender classification for intersex people as a population, but instead is about enabling an opt-in scheme for any individual who seeks it.

In some jurisdictions, access to any form of identification document can be an issue.

=== Gender identities ===
Like all individuals, some intersex individuals may be raised as a particular sex (male or female) but then identify with another later in life, while most do not. Like non-intersex people, some intersex individuals may not identify themselves as either exclusively female or exclusively male. A 2012 clinical review suggests that between 8.5-20% of persons with intersex conditions may experience gender dysphoria, while sociological research in Australia, a country with a third 'X' sex classification, shows that 19% of people born with atypical sex characteristics selected an "X" or "other" option, while 52% are women, 23% men and 6% unsure.

=== Access to identification documents ===
Depending on the jurisdiction, access to any birth certificate may be an issue, including a birth certificate with a sex marker.

In 2014, in the case of Baby 'A' (Suing through her Mother E.A) & another v Attorney General & 6 others [2014], a Kenyan court ordered the Kenyan government to issue a birth certificate to a five-year-old child born in 2009 with ambiguous genitalia. In Kenya a birth certificate is necessary for attending school, getting a national identity document, and voting. Many intersex persons in Uganda are understood to be stateless due to historical difficulties in obtaining identification documents, despite a birth registration law that permits intersex minors to change assignment.

=== Access to the same rights as other men and women ===
The Asia Pacific Forum of National Human Rights Institutions states that:

Recognition before the law means having legal personhood and the legal protections that flow from that. For intersex people, this is neither primarily nor solely about amending birth registrations or other official documents. Firstly, it is about intersex people who have been issued a male or a female birth certificate being able to enjoy the same legal rights as other men and women.

=== Binary categories ===
Access to a birth certificate with a correct sex marker may be an issue for people who do not identify with their sex assigned at birth, or it may only be available accompanied by surgical requirements.

The passports and identification documents of Australia and some other nationalities have adopted "X" as a valid third category besides "M" (male) and "F" (female), at least since 2003. In 2013, Germany became the first European nation to allow babies with characteristics of both sexes to be registered as indeterminate gender on birth certificates, amidst opposition and skepticism from intersex organisations who point out that the law appears to mandate exclusion from male or female categories. The Council of Europe acknowledged this approach, and concerns about recognition of third and blank classifications in a 2015 Issue Paper, stating that these may lead to "forced outings" and "lead to an increase in pressure on parents of intersex children to decide in favour of one sex." The Issue Paper argues that "further reflection on non-binary legal identification is necessary":

Mauro Cabral, Global Action for Trans Equality (GATE) Co-Director, indicated that any recognition outside the "F"/"M" dichotomy needs to be adequately planned and executed with a human rights point of view, noting that:

"People tend to identify a third sex with freedom from the gender binary, but that is not necessarily the case. If only trans and/or intersex people can access that third category, or if they are compulsively assigned a third sex, then the gender binary gets stronger, not weaker"

== Intersex rights by jurisdiction ==
Read country-specific pages on intersex rights via the links on the country name, where available.

=== Africa ===
Country/jurisdiction	Physical integrity and bodily autonomy	Anti-discrimination protection	Access to identification documents	Access to same rights as other men and women	Changing M/F identification documents	Third gender or sex classifications	Ending official classification by sex or gender	Sex and gender distinctions	Assign infants and children to male or female
Kenya	Since 2022 Yes	No	Yes			Since 2022 Yes			
South Africa	No	Yes	Yes	Yes	Yes Subject to medical and social reports				
Uganda	No	No			Yes				
Nigeria	No	No	No		No				

=== Americas ===
Country/jurisdiction	Physical integrity and bodily autonomy	Anti-discrimination protection	Access to identification documents	Access to same rights as other men and women	Changing M/F identification documents	Third gender or sex classifications	Ending official classification by sex or gender	Sex and gender distinctions	Assign infants and children to male or female
Argentina	No	No			Yes Self-determination	Yes Since July 2021, gender X became available and implemented			
Canada	No	No	Yes		Yes Self-determination	Yes Also available for Canadian passport holders with male, female and X options.			
Chile	Yes	Yes	Yes		Yes Self-determination	Yes			
Colombia	No No, but restricted in children aged over 5.	No			Yes Self-determination				
Mexico	No	No				Yes Since May 2023, a gender X option formally became available on Passports within Mexico - alongside male and female options.			
United States	No	Partial, in healthcare		No Laws on female genital mutilation not enforced		Yes / No Opt in only for Washington D.C., California, New York City, Ohio (with a court order only), New Mexico, Nevada, Oregon, Utah (with a court order only), Washington State, New Jersey, Colorado, and Michigan. US Passports since January 2025 had no longer issued the gender X option, keeping previously-issued gender X passports still valid; however, in June 2025, per court order, "X"-gender passports started being issued again. Firearms transfer ATF forms and documents also have male, female and non-binary options since 2021.			
Uruguay	Yes				Yes Self-determination	Yes			

=== Asia ===
Country/jurisdiction	Physical integrity and bodily autonomy	Anti-discrimination protection	Access to identification documents	Access to same rights as other men and women	Changing M/F identification documents	Third gender or sex classifications	Ending official classification by sex or gender	Sex and gender distinctions	Assign infants and children to male or female
Bangladesh	No	No				Yes			
China	No	No							
India	No	No			Yes	Yes			
Japan	No	No			Requires surgery				
Nepal	No	No			Yes	Yes			
Pakistan	No	Yes			Yes Self-determination	Yes			
South Korea	No	No			Yes				
Thailand	No	No			Requires surgery				
Vietnam	No	No			Requires surgery				

=== Europe ===
Country/jurisdiction	Physical integrity and bodily autonomy	Anti-discrimination protection	Access to identification documents	Access to same rights as other men and women	Changing M/F identification documents	Third gender or sex classifications	Ending official classification by sex or gender	Sex and gender distinctions	Assign infants and children to male or female
Albania	Yes	Yes							
Austria						Yes			
Bosnia and Herzegovina	No	Yes							
Belgium					Yes Self-determination				
Denmark	No	No			Yes Self-determination	No			
Finland	No	Yes			Yes Self-determination	No			
France	No	No				No			
Germany	Yes with exceptions	No			Yes Self-determination	Yes			
Greece	No	Yes			Yes Self-determination				
Iceland	No	Yes			Yes Self-determination	Yes			
(Republic of Ireland) Ireland	No	No			Yes Self-determination	No			
Jersey	No	Yes							
Luxembourg					Yes				
Malta	Yes Legislated	Yes	Yes	Yes	Yes Self-determination	Yes			
Montenegro	No	Yes	No	No	No	No	No	No	No
Netherlands		Yes							
Norway		No			Yes Self-determination				
Portugal	No Legislated	Yes	Yes	Yes	Yes Self-determination	Yes			
Serbia	No	Yes							
Sweden		Yes			Yes Self-determination effective from July 1, 2025 - under enacted April 2024 legislation passed in Sweden				
Switzerland	No	No			Yes Self-determination	No			
United Kingdom	No	No			No Requires diagnosis of gender dysphoria	No			

=== Oceania ===
Country/jurisdiction	Physical integrity and bodily autonomy	Anti-discrimination protection	Access to identification documents	Access to same rights as other men and women	Changing M/F identification documents	Third gender or sex classifications	Ending official classification by sex or gender	Sex and gender distinctions	Assign infants and children to male or female
Australia	No	Yes At federal level		No Exemptions regarding sport and female genital mutilation	Yes Policies vary depending on jurisdiction Requires sexual reassignment surgery since 1996 within NSW - until June 30, 2025. "Appropriate clinical treatment" required in NT, SA and WA. Self-determination in ACT, VIC, TAS, QLD (and NSW effective from July 1, 2025).	Yes (Passports) Yes Opt in at federal level, state/territory policies vary			
New Zealand	No	No (Under sex, however indirectly implied under the Human Rights Act 1993)		No Exemptions regarding female genital mutilation	Yes Self-determination	Yes (Passports) (Third birth certificate may be used if determined at birth)			

== See also ==
- Intersex Awareness Day
- Intersex people and military service
- Intersex human rights reports
- Intersex infanticide
- Intersex medical interventions
- Discrimination against intersex people
- Legal recognition of intersex people

== Bibliography ==
- Amnesty International (2017). First, Do No Harm.
- Androgen Insensitivity Support Syndrome Support Group Australia; Intersex Trust Aotearoa New Zealand; Organisation Intersex International Australia; Black, Eve; Bond, Kylie; Briffa, Tony; Carpenter, Morgan; Cody, Candice; David, Alex; Driver, Betsy; Hannaford, Carolyn; Harlow, Eileen; Hart, Bonnie; Hart, Phoebe; Leckey, Delia; Lum, Steph; Mitchell, Mani Bruce; Nyhuis, Elise; O'Callaghan, Bronwyn; Perrin, Sandra; Smith, Cody; Williams, Trace; Yang, Imogen; Yovanovic, Georgie (March 2017). "Darlington Statement". Archived from the original on 2017-03-22.
- Asia Pacific Forum of National Human Rights Institutions (June 2016). Promoting and Protecting Human Rights in relation to Sexual Orientation, Gender Identity and Sex Characteristics. ISBN 978-0-9942513-7-4. Archived from the original on 2017-01-15.
- Council of Europe; Commissioner for Human Rights (April 2015). "Human rights and intersex people, Issue Paper".
- Davis, Georgiann (2015). Contesting Intersex, The Dubious Diagnosis. New York: NYU Press. ISBN 978-1-4798-3786-1.
- Elders, M Joycelyn; Satcher, David; Carmona, Richard (June 2017). "Re-Thinking Genital Surgeries on Intersex Infants" (PDF). Palm Center. Archived from the original (PDF) on 2019-04-12.
- Ghattas, Dan Christian; Heinrich-Böll-Stiftung (2013). Human Rights between the Sexes: A preliminary study on the life situations of inter*individuals. Berlin: Heinrich-Böll-Stiftung. ISBN 978-3-86928-107-0.
- Human Rights Commission of the City and County of San Francisco; de María Arana, Marcus (2005). A Human Rights Investigation Into The Medical "Normalization" Of Intersex People. San Francisco.
- Human Rights Watch; interACT (July 2017). I Want to Be Like Nature Made Me. Human Rights Watch. ISBN 978-1-62313-502-7.
- Jones, Tiffany; Hart, Bonnie; Carpenter, Morgan; Ansara, Gavi; Leonard, William; Lucke, Jayne (2016). Intersex: Stories and Statistics from Australia (PDF). Cambridge, UK: Open Book Publishers. ISBN 978-1-78374-208-0. Archived from the original (PDF) on 14 September 2016.
- Karkazis, Katrina (2008). Fixing Sex: Intersex, Medical Authority, and Lived Experience. Duke University Press. ISBN 978-0-8223-4318-9.
- Malta declaration (International Intersex Forum), "Statement of the Third International Intersex Forum". ILGA Europe Creative Commons statement. December 2, 2013. Archived from the original on December 4, 2013.
- National Advisory Commission on Biomedical Ethics, Switzerland (November 2012). On the management of differences of sex development. Ethical issues relating to "intersexuality".Opinion No. 20/2012 (PDF). Berne. Archived from the original (PDF) on 2015-04-23.
- OII Europe; Bilitis; Intersex Belgium; Intersex Iceland; Intersex Russia; Intersex Scandinavia; NNID; OII Germany; OII-Italia; OII Netherlands; TRIQ Inter*-Projekt; X-Y Spectrum (April 20, 2017). "Statement of the 1st European Intersex Community Event (Vienna, 30th - 31st of March 2017)". OII Europe.
- Regmi, Esan (2016). Stories of Intersex People from Nepal. Kathmandu.
- Senate of Australia; Community Affairs References Committee (2013). Involuntary or coerced sterilisation of intersex people in Australia. Canberra. ISBN 978-1-74229-917-4.
- Tamar-Mattis, Anne (2014). "Medical Treatment of People with Intersex Conditions as Torture and Cruel, Inhuman, or Degrading Treatment or Punishment". In Center for Human Rights & Humanitarian Law; Washington College of Law (eds.). Torture in Healthcare Settings: Reflections on the Special Rapporteur on Torture's 2013 Thematic Report. Washington, DC. pp. 91–104. Archived from the original on 2016-03-14.
- United Nations Office of the High Commissioner for Human Rights (2015). "Free & Equal Campaign Fact Sheet: Intersex" (PDF).
- UN Special Rapporteur on torture and other cruel, inhuman or degrading treatment or punishment (February 2013). "Report of the UN Special Rapporteur on Torture" (PDF). Office of the UN High Commissioner for Human Rights.
- "Intersex Awareness Day – Wednesday 26 October". Office of the United Nations High Commissioner for Human Rights. 24 October 2016.
- World Health Organization; OHCHR; UN Women; UNAIDS; UNDP; UNFPA; UNICEF (2014). Eliminating forced, coercive and otherwise involuntary sterilization, An interagency statement (PDF). ISBN 978-92-4-150732-5.
- World Health Organization (2015). Sexual health, human rights and the law. Geneva: World Health Organization. ISBN 978-92-4-156498-4.
