= Intersex rights in Canada =

Rights of intersex individuals in Canada

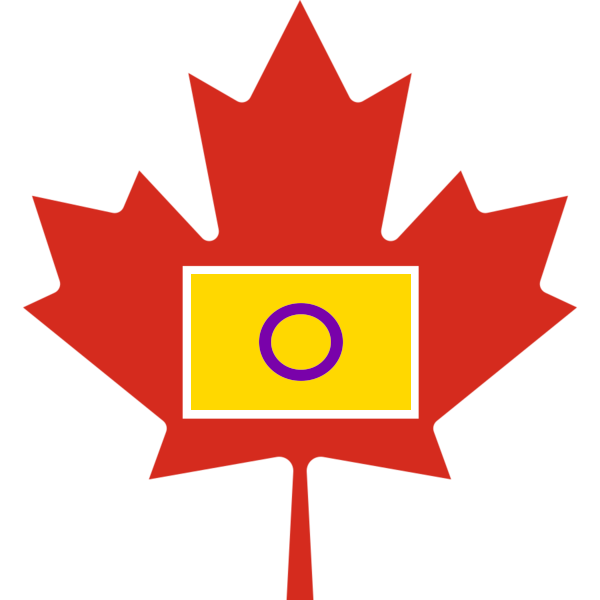
- Protection of physical integrity and bodily autonomy: No
- Protection from discrimination: No
- Access to identification documents: Yes
- Changing M/F sex classifications: Yes
- Third gender or sex classifications: Yes
- Marriage: Yes
- Rights by country: Argentina; Australia; Canada; Chile; China; Colombia; France; Germany; Kenya; Malta; Mexico; Nepal; New Zealand; South Africa; Spain; Switzerland; Taiwan; Uganda; United Kingdom; United States

Intersex people in Canada have no recognition of their rights to physical integrity and bodily autonomy, and no specific protections from discrimination on the basis of sex characteristics. Academic advocates including Janik Bastien-Charlebois and Morgan Holmes, and organizations including Egale Canada and the Canadian Bar Association have called for reform.

== Physical integrity and bodily autonomy ==
Legal prohibition of non-consensual medical interventions Regulatory suspension or limitation of harmful practices Legal prohibition in at least one state/province

The definition of aggravated assault under Section 268 of the Criminal Code contains an exemption that explicitly permits surgical interventions to modify the characteristics of individuals to make them appear more typical:

Excision

(3) For greater certainty, in this section, “wounds” or “maims” includes to excise, infibulate or mutilate, in whole or in part, the labia majora, labia minora or clitoris of a person, except where

(a) a surgical procedure is performed, by a person duly qualified by provincial law to practise medicine, for the benefit of the physical health of the person or for the purpose of that person having normal reproductive functions or normal sexual appearance or function; or

(b) the person is at least eighteen years of age and there is no resulting bodily harm.

—

For Intersex Awareness Day in October 2018, Egale Canada published a statement calling on the Canadian government to protect the rights of intersex persons, fulfilling "treaty body obligations under international law," and accompanied by a submission to the UN Committee Against Torture. The statement referred to Criminal Code [s. 268(3)], stating that it "allows for parents and medical practitioners to undertake nonconsensual, cosmetic surgeries on intersex infants". Egale called on the Canadian government to:

* Investigate cases of intersex genital mutilation and other medical malpractices pertaining to non consensual, cosmetic surgeries on intersex children;

- Follow best practices with regard to providing free and informed consent, in compliance with its treaty body obligations;
- Make necessary amendments to the criminal code adopt legal provisions to redress and compensate victims.

In May 2019, the Canadian Bar Association called on the government to amend the Criminal Code, "to postpone genital normalizing surgeries on children until the child can meaningfully participate in the decision – except where there is immediate risk to the child's health and medical treatment cannot be delayed."

On June 15, 2021, Egale Canada filed an application to the Ontario Superior Court of Justice challenging the constitutionality of Section 268(3)(a) of the Criminal Code.

== Identification documents ==
All individuals (intersex or not) with non-binary gender can obtain Canadian passports with an "X" sex descriptor.

== Marriage ==
Since the passing of the Civil Marriage Act in 2005, marriage has been defined as "the lawful union of two persons to the exclusion of all others."

== Rights advocacy ==
Notable intersex rights advocates in Canada include Janik Bastien-Charlebois and Morgan Holmes.

== See also ==
- Intersex human rights
- LGBTQ rights in Canada
- Transgender rights in Canada
- Canadian values

== Bibliography ==
- Bastien Charlebois, Janik (December 2017). "Les sujets intersexes peuvent-ils (se) penser ?. Les empiétements de l'injustice épistémique sur le processus de subjectivation politique des personnes intersex(ué)es". Socio. La nouvelle revue des sciences sociales (9): 143–162. doi:10.4000/socio.2945. ISSN 2266-3134.
- Bastien-Charlebois, Janik (2014). "Femmes intersexes: Sujet politique extrême du féminisme (Intersex Women, Feminism's Extreme Political Subject)". Recherches féministes. 27 (1): 237. doi:10.7202/1025425ar. ISSN 0838-4479.
- Egale Canada (2018-10-22), Egale's Submission to the UN Committee Against Torture (UN CAT) for Intersex Rights -
- Holmes, Morgan (2008). Intersex: A Perilous Difference. Selinsgrove, Pennsylvania: Susquehanna University Press. ISBN 978-1575911175.
- Holmes, Morgan, ed. (2009). Critical Intersex. Ashgate Publishing. ISBN 9780754673118.
- Holmes, Morgan (October 14, 2015), When Max Beck and Morgan Holmes went to Boston, Intersex Day
