= Intersex rights in France =

Intersex people's rights in France

- Location of Metropolitan France (dark green) – in Europe (light green & dark grey) – in the European Union (light green) – [Legend]
- Protection of physical integrity and bodily autonomy: No
- Protection from discrimination: No
- Third gender or sex classifications: No
- Marriage: Yes
- Rights by country: Argentina; Australia; Canada; Chile; China; Colombia; France; Germany; Kenya; Malta; Mexico; Nepal; New Zealand; South Africa; Spain; Switzerland; Taiwan; Uganda; United Kingdom; United States

Intersex people in France face significant gaps in protection from non-consensual medical interventions and protection from discrimination. The birth of Abel Barbin, a nineteenth-century intersex woman, is marked in Intersex Day of Remembrance. Barbin may have been the first intersex person to write a memoir, later published by Michel Foucault.

In response to pressure from intersex activists and recommendations by United Nations Treaty Bodies, the Senate published an inquiry into the treatment of intersex people in February 2017. It calls for significant changes to some medical practices, and compensation for individuals subjected to medical treatment deemed to be medically unnecessary or done without informed consent. An individual, Gaëtan Schmitt, has taken legal action to obtain civil status as "neutral sex" ("sexe neutre") but, in May 2017, this was rejected by the Court of Cassation.

== History ==
The 12th-century canon law collection known as the Decretum Gratiani states that "Whether an hermaphrodite may witness a testament, depends on which sex prevails" ("Hermafroditus an ad testamentum adhiberi possit, qualitas sexus incalescentis ostendit."). On ordainment, Raming, Macy and Cook found that the Decretum Gratiani states, "item Hermafroditus. If therefore the person is drawn to the feminine more than the male, the person does not receive the order. If the reverse, the person is able to receive but ought not to be ordained on account of deformity and monstrosity."

Herculine Barbin was raised in a convent in the early nineteenth century. From puberty, her body began to exhibit more masculine traits. In line with early legal practices, she was reassigned as male following an affair. She subsequently took her own life. She may have been the earliest intersex person to write a memoir, and these were later published by Michel Foucault, accompanied by a commentary and other materials. In his commentary to Barbin's memoirs, Foucault presented Barbin as an example of the "happy limbo of a non-identity", but whose masculinity marked her from her contemporaries. Morgan Holmes states that Barbin's own writings showed that she saw herself as an "exceptional female", but female nonetheless. Barbin's birth is now marked as Intersex Day of Remembrance.

One of the earliest international gatherings of intersex people took place in 2006 in Paris, a summer school organized by OII-France. The summer school is memorialized in a book, A qui appartiennent nos corps? Féminisme et luttes intersexes.

== Physical integrity and bodily autonomy ==
Legal prohibition of non-consensual medical interventions Regulatory suspension of non-consensual medical interventions

In February 2016, the United Nations Committee on the Rights of the Child published recommendations calling for an end to unnecessary surgery or treatment on children, and development of a "rights-based health care protocol for intersex children". In May 2016, the United Nations Committee Against Torture urged the French government to ensure respect for the physical integrity of intersex people, stating:

Take the necessary legislative, administrative and other measures to guarantee respect for the physical integrity of intersex individuals, so that no one is subjected during childhood to non-urgent medical or surgical procedures intended to establish one's sex.

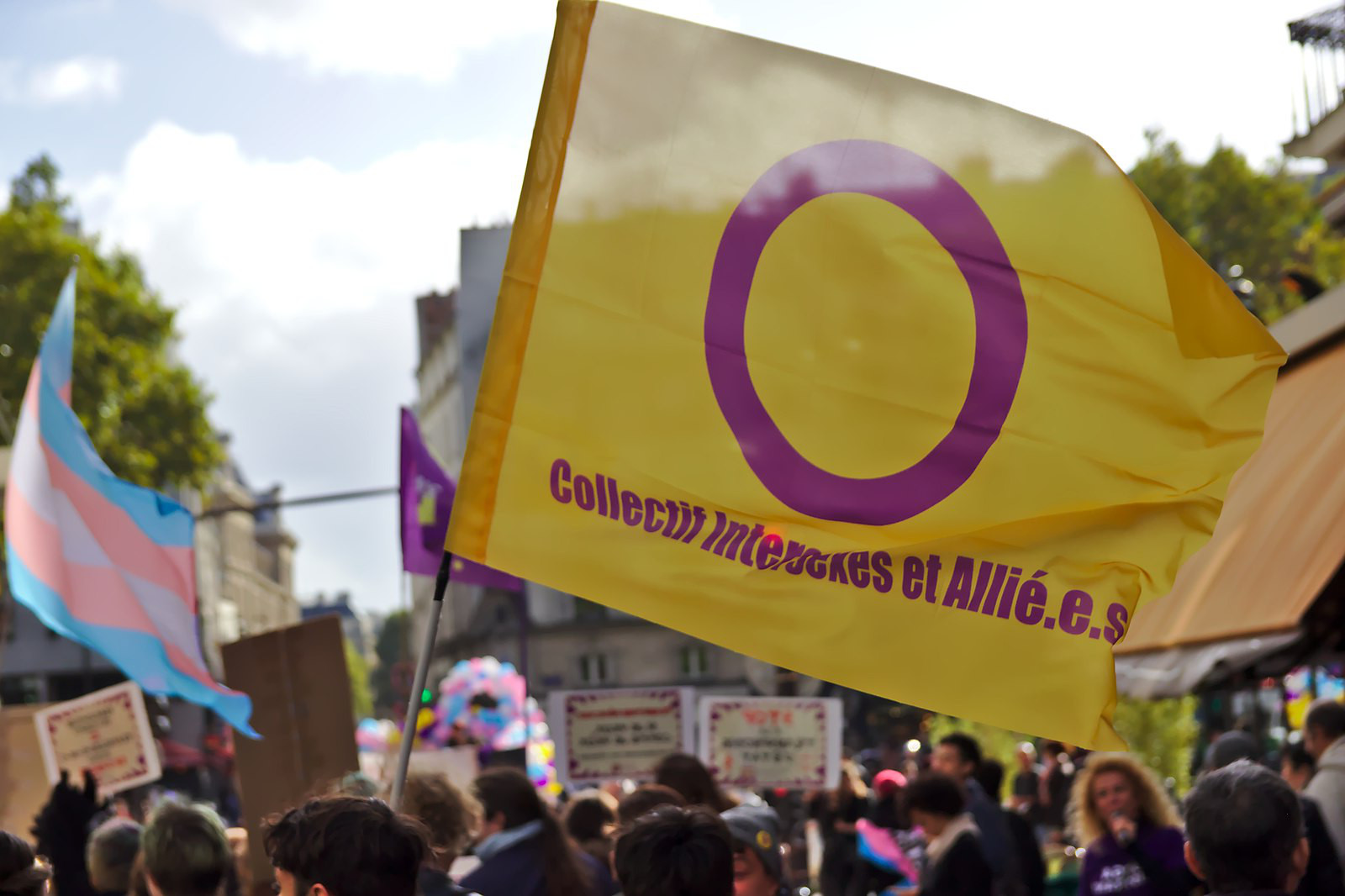
Existrans 2017, with banner reading "Intersex and Allied Collective." Paris, 2017

In 2017, the French Senate published the second parliamentary inquiry into the wellbeing and rights of intersex people (after Australia in 2013). Vincent Guillot of Organisation Intersex International states that the document illuminates the absurdity of clinical practices, but is problematic where it distinguishes infants with congenital adrenal hyperplasia and ambiguous genitalia from intersex persons, describing women with congenital adrenal hyperplasia as "failed women".

On 17 March 2017, the president of the Republic, François Hollande, described medical interventions to make the bodies of intersex children more typically male or female as increasingly considered to be mutilations.

== Remedies and claims for compensation ==
In response to recommendations by the United Nations Committee Against Torture, a February 2017 report by the Senate delegation on the rights of women has called for compensation for intersex people who suffer the consequences of medical interventions.

== Protection from discrimination ==
Explicit protection from discrimination on grounds of sex characteristics Explicit protection on grounds of intersex status Explicit protection on grounds of intersex within attribute of sex

=== Sport ===
French medical practitioners have been responsible for implementing policies of the International Association of Athletics Federations regarding sex verification in sports. In 2013, it was reported by Patrick Fénichel, Stéphane Bermon and others that four elite female athletes from developing countries were subjected to partial clitoridectomies and gonadectomies (sterilization) after testosterone testing revealed that they had an intersex condition. Members of the same clinical hormone evaluation team report there is no evidence that innate hyperandrogenism in elite women athletes confers an advantage in sport. The case has been criticized as showing vulnerability of women athletes to unnecessary medical interventions under duress, with no evidence of cheating and no evidence of athletic advantage.

Associated Press reported during the Rio Olympics on an anonymous African athlete subjected to medical investigations and treatments in Nice, France, in order to compete.

Sex verification policies are currently suspended following the case of Dutee Chand v. Athletics Federation of India (AFI) & The International Association of Athletics Federations, in the Court of Arbitration for Sport, decided in July 2015.

== Identification documents ==
Article 57 of the Civil Code requires that birth certificates must state the sex of a child, though it does not specify any further details about the meaning or limits of the requirement.

Gaëtan Schmitt, a psychotherapist born in 1951 in Tours with ambiguous genitalia (micropenis and a "rudimentary vagina") sought recognition of "neutral sex" civil status. In a judgement on 20 August 2015, the Tribunal de Grande Instance in Tours supported this status, a first for France. On appeal, the decision was overturned by the Court of Appeal in Orleans in March 2016. Schmitt's legal team described an initial male assignment as "fictive", and called for the government to recognize and adapt to human diversity. The team acting for the government argued that creating new civil status categories should be a matter of legislation, not the courts. On 4 May 2017, the Court of Cassation refused to recognize "neutral sex", stating that the existing two sexes were necessary for social and legal organization, and change would have profound implications for French law.

Prior to the Court of Cassation decision, Vincent Guillot, a founder of Organisation Intersex International, described Schmitt as a friend, and Schmitt's lawyer's reasoning excellent, but also described third gender recognition as stigmatizing. Citing the Malta declaration, Guillot called for respect for fundamental rights and abolishing sex as a legal status, as with race and religion.

== Rights advocacy ==
Notable intersex rights organizations in France include Collectif intersexe activiste.

== See also ==
- Herculine Barbin
- Herculine Barbin: Being the Recently Discovered Memoirs of a Nineteenth-century French Hermaphrodite
- Intersex human rights
- LGBT rights in France

== Bibliography ==
- Barbin, Herculine (1980). Herculine Barbin: Being the Recently Discovered Memoirs of a Nineteenth-century French Hermaphrodite. introd. Michel Foucault, trans. Richard McDougall. New York: Pantheon Books. ISBN 978-0-394-50821-4.
- Guillot, Vincent; Zwischengeschlecht (April 3, 2016). "NGO Report to the 7th Periodic Report of France on the Convention against Torture and Other Cruel, Inhuman or Degrading Treatment or Punishment (CAT)".
- Nouvelles Questions Féministes (2008). À qui appartiennent nos corps ?. Nouvelles Questions Féministes (in French). Vol. 27. Lausanne: Antipodes. ISBN 978-2-88901-007-3.
- Sénat; Blondin, Maryvonne; Bouchoux, Corinne (2017-02-23). Variations du développement sexuel : lever un tabou, lutter contre la stigmatisation et les exclusions. 2016-2017 (in French). Paris, France: Sénat.
- United Nations; Committee against Torture (June 10, 2016). "Concluding observations on the seventh periodic report of France". Geneva.
- United Nations; Office of the High Commissioner for Human Rights (2015). "Free & Equal Campaign Fact Sheet: Intersex" (PDF) (in French).
