= Intersex rights in Colombia =

- Colombia
- Protection of physical integrity and bodily autonomy: No
- Protection from discrimination: No
- Changing M/F sex classifications: Yes
- Marriage: Yes
- Rights by country: Argentina; Australia; Canada; Chile; China; Colombia; France; Germany; Kenya; Malta; Mexico; Nepal; New Zealand; South Africa; Spain; Switzerland; Taiwan; Uganda; United Kingdom; United States

In 1999, the Constitutional Court of Colombia became the first court to consider the human rights implications of medical interventions to alter the sex characteristics of intersex children. The Court restricted the age at which intersex children could be the subjects of surgical interventions.

== History ==
The Constitutional Court of Colombia was the first court to consider the human rights implications of intersex medical interventions, in a case that restricted the age at which intersex children could be the subjects of surgical interventions.

In April 2018, Latin American and Caribbean intersex activists published the San José de Costa Rica statement, defining local demands.

== Physical integrity and bodily autonomy ==
Legal prohibition of non-consensual medical interventions Regulatory suspension of non-consensual medical interventions

Explicit protection from discrimination on grounds of sex characteristics Explicit protection on grounds of intersex status Explicit protection on grounds of intersex within attribute of sex

Colombia does not prohibit harmful practices on children, but they are regulated through a series of decisions made by the Constitutional Court of Colombia relating to the bodily autonomy of infants and children, including those with intersex conditions.

=== Sentencia T-477/95 ===
In Sentencia T-477/95, the Court considered the case of YY, a non-intersex teenage boy who had been raised a girl after an accidental castration and subsequent feminizing genital surgeries. He took the case after learning of his medical history. The Court ruled that the teenager's right to identity had been violated, and that the sex of a child could not be altered without the child's informed consent.

=== Sentencia SU-337/99 ===
In Sentencia SU-337/99, of May 12, 1999, the Court varied the earlier decision on informed consent for genital surgeries in children. The Court ruled in the case of XX, an 8-year old with ambiguous genitalia, androgen insensitivity and XY chromosomes, raised as a girl. Doctors recommended feminizing surgeries, including a gonadectomy, vaginoplasty and clitoroplasty before puberty, but the hospital would not proceed without the consent of the Colombian Institute of Family Welfare and the Office of the Public Advocate (Defensor del Pueblo de la Seccional del Departamento XX). The mother brought a case against Institute and Office of the Public Advocate, seeking to provide substitute consent. The mother argued that “the capacity to decide, it would be too late and would prevent normal psychological, physical, and social development”.

The Court refused the mother's claim. It questioned the urgency of the case, argued by medical teams. Civil rights advocates and a minority of doctors favored deferring treatment due to lack of evidence and the irreversible nature of the proposed interventions. The Court observed that advocates of surgery were more numerous than opponents, alternatives to surgery were not entirely feasible, and surgeries had improved, “making it less likely that sexual sensitivity would be destroyed; and the medical community was improving communication with parents”. However, some doctors refused to respond to criticisms of surgery, while some others questioned their surgical approach.

The Court determined that a constitutional protection of a right to free development of personality meant that a child's autonomy increases with age, including the development of a gender identity and bodily awareness. The Court determined that genital surgeries should not be conducted on children over the age of five. It determined that multidisciplinary teams should assess children's needs on a case-by-case basis.

The (now defunct) Intersex Society of North America stated that the Court decisions "significantly restrict the ability of parents and doctors to resort to the scalpel when children are born with atypical genitals", in a case that was "the first time that a high court anywhere has considered whether [Intersex Genital Mutilation] is a violation of human rights." Morgan Holmes states that, while children who reach the same age and circumstances will be in the same position, then they will "be permitted access to the conditions that protect their autonomies". Other intersex children will not benefit, in particular at the point they are born: "In its worst potential implications and uses, the court's decision may simply amplify the need to expedite procedures".

=== Sentencia T-551/99 ===
In Sentencia T-551/99, later in 1999, the Court ruled in the case of NN, a two-year-old intersex child unable to consent to genital surgeries. Basing a decision on the case of XX, the Court determined that parents could give permission for the normalization of their child's genitals as long as the informed consent was "qualified and persistent." However, this did not exist in the case of NN, because the "parents were led to believe that genital-normalizing surgery was the only option for their daughter. The parents did not examine alternative options to surgery; therefore, their decision did not consider the best interests of the child".

=== Sentencia T-912/08 ===
In Sentencia T-912/08, the Court ruled in the case of a five-year-old child, ruling that parents and child could give joint consent. In cases where the child and parents had different opinions, no surgery could take place until adulthood.

== Identification documents ==
On June 4, 2015, the Government issued a decree, signed by the Ministry of Justice and the Ministry of the Interior enabling simple administrative changes to legal gender by signing a document before a notary.

== See also ==
- Intersex human rights
- LGBT rights in Colombia

== Bibliography ==
- Comisión Interamericana de Derechos Humanos (Inter-American Commission on Human Rights ) (November 2015), Violencia contra Personas Lesbianas, Gays, Bisexuales, Trans e Intersex en América (PDF)
- Cabral, Mauro, ed. (February 2009). Interdicciones: Escrituras de la intersexualidad en castellano. Córdoba, Argentina: Mulabi. ISBN 978-987-05-5898-9.
- Holmes, Morgan (2006). "Deciding fate or protecting a developing autonomy? Intersex children and the Colombian Constitutional Court". Transgender Rights. Minneapolis, Minnesota: University of Minnesota Press. pp. 32–50.
