= Intersex rights in the United Kingdom =

Overview of intersex people's rights in the United Kingdom

- Location of the United Kingdom
- Protection of physical integrity and bodily autonomy: No
- Protection from discrimination: No / Yes (Jersey)
- Access to same rights as other men and women: No
- Changing M/F sex classifications: No
- Third gender or sex classifications: No
- Marriage: Yes
- Rights by country: Argentina; Australia; Canada; Chile; China; Colombia; France; Germany; Kenya; Malta; Mexico; Nepal; New Zealand; South Africa; Spain; Switzerland; Taiwan; Uganda; United Kingdom; United States

Intersex rights in the United Kingdom have varied considerably since the country's inception, though Intersex people currently face significant gaps in legal protections, particularly in protection from non-consensual medical interventions, and protection from discrimination. Actions by intersex civil society organisations aim to eliminate unnecessary medical interventions and harmful practices, promote social acceptance, and equality in line with Council of Europe and United Nations demands. Intersex civil society organisations campaign for greater social acceptance, understanding of issues of bodily autonomy, and recognition of the human rights of intersex people.

== History ==
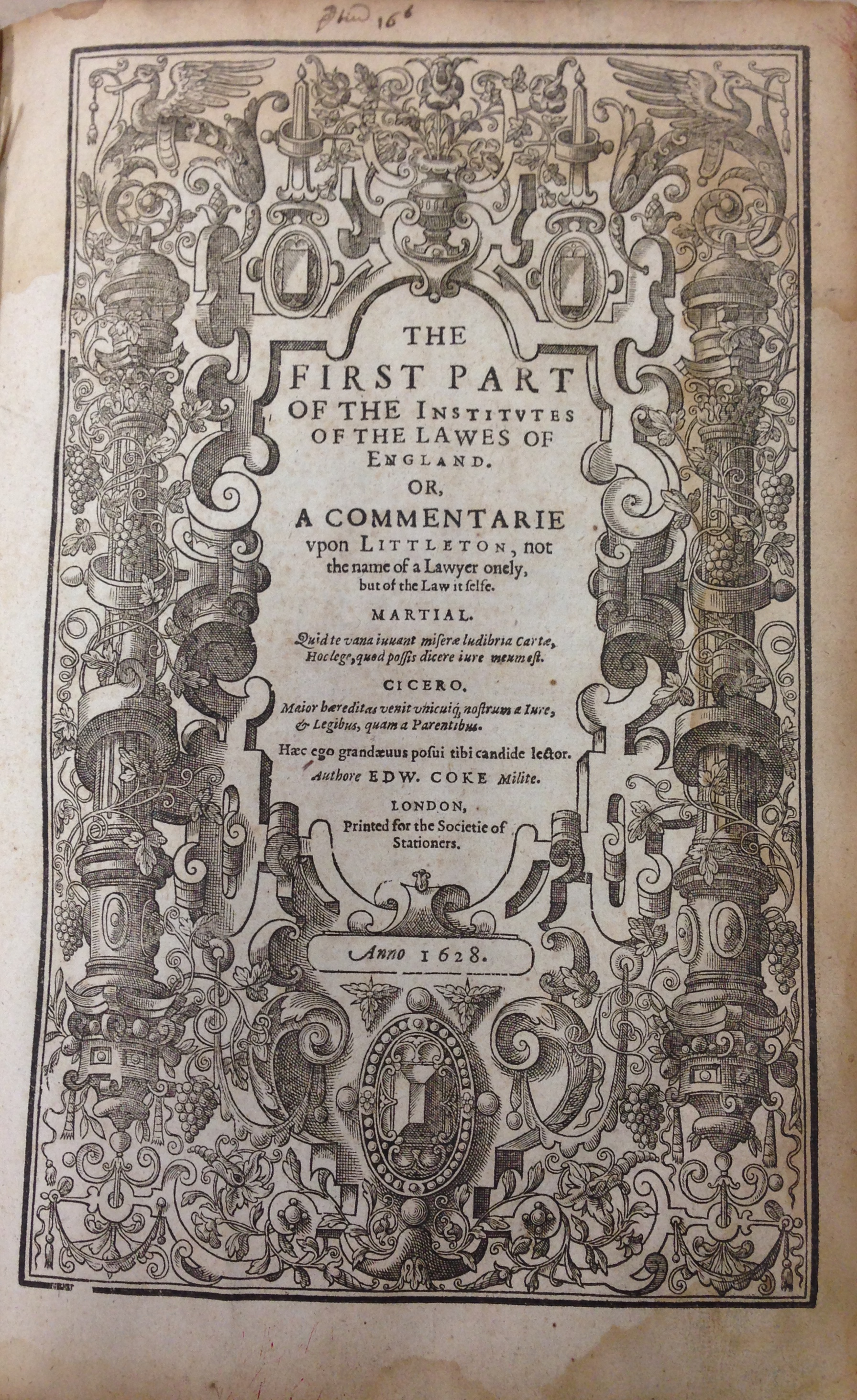
Edward Coke, The First Part of the Institutes of the Lawes of England (1st ed, 1628, title page)

English jurist and judge Edward Coke (Lord Coke), wrote in his Institutes of the Lawes of England on laws of succession stating, "Every heire is either a male, a female, or an hermaphrodite, that is both male and female. And an hermaphrodite (which is also called Androgynus) shall be heire, either as male or female, according to that kind of sexe which doth prevaile." The Institutes are widely held to be a foundation of common law.

Accounts of intersex people include, in the mid 19th-century, The Welshman newspaper published an account of a child on 7 November 1851. Another case was reported in 1906 by The Cambrian newspaper in Wales, on the death in Cardiff of an intersex child who, at post-mortem examination, was determined to be a girl. Known historical intersex figures in the UK include Sir Ewan Forbes (1912–1991), 11th Baronet of Craigievar, Dawn Langley Simmons (1937 or 1922 to 2000), English author and biographer, and Georgina Somerset (née Turtle) (1923–2013), the first openly intersex person in the UK. Prominent present day individuals include "national LGBT treasure" Seven Graham, writer Iain Morland, Lady Colin Campbell, author of Guide to Being a Modern Lady, Lisa Lee Dark, Welsh opera singer and voice actress, Dee Palmer of Jethro Tull, and Caroline Cossey.

The first recorded suggestion to replace the term 'hermaphrodite' with 'intersex', in medicine, came from British physician [[Alexander Polycleitos Cawadias]] in the 1940s. This suggestion was taken up by other physicians in the UK during the 1960s.

The Androgen Insensitivity Syndrome Support Group (UK) established in 1988, three years after an equivalent Australian group, and some years before the (now-defunct) Intersex Society of North America (ISNA). It has since been joined by Organisation Intersex International UK, Intersex UK and the UK Intersex Association (UKIA).

Intersex UK co-founder Holly Greenberry spoke at the "first United Nations Human Rights Council side event on intersex issues" in March 2014, alongside Mauro Cabral and representatives of Organisation Intersex International Australia and Zwischengeschlecht. She was also quoted in a feature in The Independent stating: "We are at a tipping point ... Most intelligent human beings would be completely surprised and utterly dismayed at the civil inequality and human rights abuses that healthy intersex children and young adults are facing."

In a 2017 BBC News report, a representative of the Androgen Insensitivity Syndrome Support Group stated that, until 2012, doctors routinely withheld truth about patients' diagnoses from their patients.

== Physical integrity and bodily autonomy ==
Legal prohibition of non-consensual medical interventions Regulatory suspension of non-consensual medical interventions

Specialists at the Intersex Clinic at University College London began to publish evidence in 2001 that indicated the harm that can arise as a result of inappropriate interventions, and advised minimising the use of childhood surgical procedures. Data presented in recent years suggests that little has changed in practice. Creighton and others in the UK have found that clitoral surgeries on under-14s have increased since 2006, and "recent publications in the medical literature tend to focus on surgical techniques with no reports on patient experiences".

Parents are frequently considered able to consent to feminising or masculinising interventions on their child, and this may be considered standard for the treatment of physical disorders. However this is contested, particularly where interventions seek to address psychosocial concerns. A BMJ editorial in 2015 stated that parents are unduly influenced by medicalised information, may not realise that they are consenting to experimental treatments, and regret may be high. The editorial described current surgical interventions as experimental, stating that clinical confidence in constructing "normal" genital anatomies has not been borne out, and that medically credible pathways other than surgery do not yet exist.

A footnote to a House of Commons report on transgender equality in 2016 suggested that intersex medical interventions were matters of the past, and the country denied such practices in statements to the UN Committee on the Rights of the Child later the same year. However, this was belied by data presented to the UN Committee by intersex civil society organisations later in 2016, including National Health Service Hospital Episode Statistics and clinical publications. In its concluding observations, the Committee expressed concern at "medically unnecessary surgeries and other procedures on intersex children before they are able to provide their informed consent, which often entail irreversible consequences and can cause severe physical and psychological suffering, and the lack of redress and compensation in such cases". It called on the government to "guarantee bodily integrity, autonomy and self-determination to children concerned, and provide families with intersex children with adequate counselling and support", educate professionals, and provide redress.

In 2017, the president of the British Association of Paediatric Urologists stated that "irreversible surgery is rarely performed in infancy" with parents fully involved in decision-making. Holly Greenberry of Intersex UK stated that parents remain coerced into making early surgical decisions.

In October 2017, within a framework on protecting the integrity of the person, the UN Committee on the Rights of Persons with Disabilities called on the United Kingdom government to "repeal all types of legislation, regulations and practices allowing any form of forced intervention or surgery, and ensure that the right to free, prior and informed consent to treatment is upheld and that supported decision-making mechanisms and strengthened safeguards are provided, paying particular attention to women, intersex persons, girls and boys".

== Protection from discrimination ==
Explicit protection from discrimination on grounds of sex characteristics Explicit protection on grounds of intersex status Explicit protection on grounds of intersex within attribute of sex

Intersex people are protected from discrimination in Jersey. Since 1 September 2015, Discrimination (Jersey) Law 2013 includes intersex status within its definition of sex. Sex is one of the prohibited grounds under the act, meaning that discrimination on this basis is prohibited. The act provides that:

"Sex"

(1) Sex is a protected characteristic.
(2) In relation to the protected characteristic –
(a) a reference to a person who has that characteristic is a reference to a man, a woman or a person who has intersex status;
(b) a reference to persons who share the characteristic is a reference to persons who are of the same sex.
(3) In this paragraph, a person has intersex status if the person has physical, chromosomal, hormonal or genetic features that are –
(a) neither wholly male or female;
(b) a combination of male or female; or
(c) neither male nor female

— Discrimination (Jersey) Law 2013, Schedule 1, as amended

== Identification documents ==
The United Kingdom does not permit intersex people to change sex classification, except by declaring that they are transgender and following relevant medical protocols including a diagnosis of gender dysphoria.

== Right to life ==
Several intersex variations appear in a list by the UK Human Fertilisation and Embryology Authority of "serious" "genetic conditions" that may be de-selected, including 5 alpha reductase deficiency and androgen insensitivity syndrome, traits evident in elite women athletes and "the world's first openly intersex mayor". In 2015, a Council of Europe Issue Paper on Human rights and intersex people stated:

Intersex people’s right to life can be violated in discriminatory “sex selection” and “preimplantation genetic diagnosis, other forms of testing, and selection for particular characteristics”. Such de-selection or selective abortions are incompatible with ethics and human rights standards due to the discrimination perpetrated against intersex people on the basis of their sex characteristics.

== Rights advocacy ==
Notable intersex rights organisations include Intersex UK, OII-UK and the UK Intersex Association. Notable advocates include Anick Soni, co-founder of charity InterconnectedUK and a Fellow of the Royal Society of Arts, and Seven Graham. Iain Morland has written extensively on intersex issues, including through personal testimony. Morland also co-founded Critical Sexology in 2002, a continuing interdisciplinary seminar series on gender and sexuality.

== See also ==
- Intersex human rights
- Intersex UK
- LGBT rights in the United Kingdom
- Organisation Intersex International
- Transgender rights in the United Kingdom

== Bibliography ==
- Commissioner for Human Rights; Council of Europe (April 2015), Human rights and intersex people, Issue Paper
- Morland, Iain, ed. (2009). "Intersex and After". GLQ: A Journal of Lesbian and Gay Studies. 15 (2). ISBN 978-0-8223-6705-5. Archived from the original on 26 December 2014.
- Morland, Iain (2005). "'The Glans Opens Like a Book': Writing and Reading the Intersexed Body". Continuum: Journal of Media & Cultural Studies. 19 (3): 335–348. doi:10.1080/103043110500176586. S2CID 145009069.
- Morland, Iain; Willox, Dino, eds. (November 2004). Queer Theory. Palgrave Macmillan. ISBN 9781403916938.
- Simmonds, Margaret (26 September 2012). Girls/women in inverted commas – facing 'reality' as an XY-female (doctoral). University of Sussex.
- Zwischengeschlecht.org; IntersexUK; OII-UK; The UK Intersex Association (April 2016). Intersex Genital Mutilations Human Rights Violations of Children with Variations of Sex Anatomy: NGO Report to the 5th Periodic Report of the United Kingdom on the Convention on the Rights of the Child (CRC) (PDF). Zurich.
- United Nations; Committee on the Rights of Child (June 2016). "Concluding observations on the fifth periodic report of the United Kingdom of Great Britain and Northern Ireland". Geneva: United Nations.
