= Intersex rights in Chile =

- Chile
- Protection of physical integrity and bodily autonomy: Yes
- Protection from discrimination: Yes
- Access to identification documents: Yes
- Changing M/F sex classifications: Yes
- Third gender or sex classifications: Yes
- Marriage: Yes
- Rights by country: Argentina; Australia; Canada; Chile; China; Colombia; France; Germany; Kenya; Malta; Mexico; Nepal; New Zealand; South Africa; Spain; Switzerland; Taiwan; Uganda; United Kingdom; United States

Since November 7, 2023, Chile bans unnecessary and non-consensual surgeries, procedures or medical treatments on intersex newborns, children, and adolescents. Since March 15, 2022, Chile bans discrimination based on "sex characteristics" under Law 21,430 on Guarantees and Integral Protection of the Rights of Children and Adolescents. The country has the most advanced legal protection framework in Latin America.

== History ==
In 2015, Chile briefly became the second country to protect intersex infants and children from unnecessary medical interventions, following Malta, however, the regulations were superseded the following year. Chile also has an early example of court ordered compensation awarded in the Benjamín-Maricarmen case in 2012.

In April 2018, Latin American and Caribbean intersex activists published the San José de Costa Rica statement, defining local demands.

Since 2022, Chile is the first country in Latin America that provide legal protection from discrimination based on sex characteristics.

In November 2023, Chile once again issued regulations that protects intersex infants, children and adolescents from non-consensual medical interventions.

== Physical integrity and bodily autonomy ==
Legal prohibition of non-consensual medical interventions Regulatory suspension of non-consensual medical interventions

The Circular No. 15 issued in November 2023 by the Ministry of Health, based on the Convention on the Rights of the Child and Law 21,430 on Guarantees and Comprehensive Protection of the Rights of Children and Adolescents, instructs health teams to adopt measures that ensure the best interests of children and adolescents with Variations of Sex Characteristics. It explicitly prohibits surgeries, procedures or medical treatments on intersex newborns, children and adolescents, the sole purpose of which is modification to respond to social expectations and/or aesthetics without the consent of the child or adolescent. It establishes that procedures, surgeries and treatments should only be carried out exclusively for the purpose of resolving a functional incompatibility and/or removing a condition that substantially puts the health or life of the person at risk, ensuring the guarantee of the autonomy of their body and ensuring the ability of the child or adolescent to decide later, according to their identity and their desire of the reproductive process. Circulars 18/2015 and 07/2016 are annulled.

In 2015, the UN Committee on the Rights of the Child recommended that Chile recognize the rights of Chilean intersex children, and expressed concern "about cases of medically unnecessary and irreversible surgery and other treatment on intersex children":

49. In the light of its general comment No. 18 (2014) on harmful practices, adopted jointly with the Committee on the Elimination of Discrimination against Women, the Committee recommends that the State party expedite the development and implementation of a rights-based health-care protocol for intersex children that sets the procedures and steps to be followed by health teams in order to ensure that no one is subjected to unnecessary surgery or treatment during infancy or childhood, protect the rights of the children concerned to physical and mental integrity, autonomy and self-determination, provide intersex children and their families with adequate counselling and support, including from peers, and ensure effective remedy for victims, including redress and compensation.

In January 2016, the Ministry of Health of Chile ordered the suspension of unnecessary normalization treatments for intersex children, including irreversible surgery, until they reach an age when they can make decisions on their own.

The instructions were published in Circular 18, 22 December 2015, entitled "Instructions on aspects of health care to intersex children". The circular instructs the ceasing of "unnecessary "normalization" treatment of intersex children, including irreversible genital surgeries, until they are old enough to decide about their bodies", while work takes place to develop protocols that meet human rights standards. The country became the second in the world to protect intersex children from harmful practices, after Malta.

However, the 2015 circular was superseded by Circular 7 of 23 August 2016, which states that the earlier recommendation not to perform unnecessary genital surgeries does not apply to "pathologies" where sex can be clearly determined. It also does not apply in cases of congenital adrenal hyperplasia when professionals or the patient deem surgery necessary, and where a patient or their representative (such as a parent) consents. In cases where either sex may be assigned, sex assignment and surgeries may be made by agreement between parents and multidisciplinary teams, also considering the possibility of deferring surgeries to a time when a child has manifested a sexual identity. The guidelines are based on a 2006 clinical consensus document. Brújula Intersexual describes the circular as permitting interventions without supporting long-term data, and ignoring testimonies of persons subjected to early interventions.

In July 2018, the UN Committee on the Elimination of Discrimination against Women issued concluding observations on harmful practices, recommending that Chile "explicitly prohibiting the performance of unnecessary surgical or other medical treatment on intersex children until they reach an age when they can give their free, prior and informed consent". The committee also called for the provision of counselling and support to families, and education to medical professionals.

== Remedies and claims for compensation ==
=== Benjamín-Maricarmen case ===
In 1993, a baby with "ambiguous genitalia" named Maricarmen, suffered an irreversible surgical intervention. It was determined by the child's medical team that he would be raised as a girl, and his gonads and male reproductive system were removed. The parents were informed that the child had inguinal hernias. At the age of 10, in 2003, Maricarmen was to start hormone replacement therapy. In connection with this, blood tests were conducted, and these confirmed that the child's chromosomal sex was 46,XY, male. The ten-year old immediately transitioned, becoming Benjamín. Changing official documents took several years and required him to go through psychiatric and physical examinations.

On 12 August 2005, the mother filed a lawsuit against the Maule Health Service. The claim for damages was initiated in the Fourth Court of Letters of Talca, but ended up in the Supreme Court of Chile. On 14 November 2012, the Court sentenced the Maule Health Service for "lack of service" and to pay compensation of 100 million pesos for moral and psychological damages caused to Benjamín, and another 5 million for each of the parents. The ruling states that the hospital should have had exams that would allow the parents and the victim to "decide about the removal of these organs and the condition of man or woman with which they would face life and society."

== Protection from discrimination ==
Explicit protection from discrimination on grounds of sex characteristics Explicit protection on grounds of intersex status Explicit protection on grounds of intersex within attribute of sex

Law 21,430 on "Guarantees and Integral Protection of the Rights of Children and Adolescents" includes protection from discrimination on grounds of sex characteristics. The law seeks to adapt Chilean legislation to the Convention on the Rights of the Child. Article 8 on "Equality and non arbitrary discrimination" states that "No boy, girl or adolescent may be arbitrarily discriminated against because of their sex, sexual orientation, gender identity, gender expression and sex characteristics," among other distinctions. It was published in the Diario Oficial de la República de Chile on March 15, 2022 and entered into force from the date of its publication.

In April 2017, the Ministry for Education introduced a document entitled "Guidelines for Inclusion of lesbian, gay, bisexual, trans and intersex people in the Chilean educational system," aiming to promote inclusion and safeguard equality and non-discrimination. It considers suggestions to safeguard the rights of LGTBI children and adolescents in educational contexts; actions to support them in case they do not have the support of their families and learning objectives to address this issue.

On August 3, 2021, the Senate approved the bill that modifies and strengthens Law No. 20,609, which establishes measures against discrimination. The approved bill mentions sex characteristics as a category protected from discrimination, in addition to adding such protection in the Labor Code and also the Penal Code through a new definition of criminal aggravating factor. The bill goes to discussion in the Commission on Human Rights and Indigenous Peoples of the Chamber of Deputies.

== Identification documents ==
The Gender Identity Law, in effect since 2019, recognizes the right to self-perceived gender identity, allowing people over 14 years to change their name and gender on all official documents without prohibitive requirements. Since 1974, the change of gender had been possible in the country through a judicial process.

Birth certificates are available at birth showing "indeterminate" sex if it is not possible to assign a sex. According to the Civil Registry, between 2006 and 2017, 269 intersex children have been registered under the category of "indeterminate sex" on official records. The change of gender on the birth certificate must be requested through the courts when the biological sex is determined.

Law 21,430 on "Guarantees and Integral Protection of the Rights of Children and Adolescents" recognize the right to children and adolescents to develop their gender identity. Article 26 based on "Right to Identity" states that "Every boy, girl or adolescent has the right, from their birth, to have a name, a nationality, a language of origin and to be registered in the Civil Registry and Identification Service, without delay (...) Public and private institutions will be obliged to recognize and respect the identity of children, girls and adolescents in accordance with the provisions above. Likewise, they have the right to know the identity of their fathers and/or mothers, their biological origin, to preserve their family relationships in accordance with the law, to know and exercise the culture of their place of origin and, in general, to preserve and develop their own identity and idiosyncrasy, including their gender identity, in accordance with current legislation (...) When a child or adolescent is illegally deprived of any of the elements of their identity, or all of them, must be given the appropriate assistance and protection in order to restore it quickly (...) The Civil Registry and Identification Service will have simple and fast procedures that allow the birth registration of the newborns, their timely identification and that of their nationality (...) The child or adolescent must be registered with a name and two conventional surnames, leaving a record in the corresponding item, without prejudice to the right to subsequently claim the determination of their identity."

In Chile there are two public policies based on the antidiscrimination law that are, in some way, designed to protect intersex people.

On 14 June 2012, the Ministry of Health issued Circular 21 titled "Reiterates instruction on the care of trans people in the health care network". The document stipulates the reiteration to the health services the duty of officials to respect gender identity and the social name of trans and intersex people, with emphasis on primary health care. It points out that intersex people, in comparison with trans people, "may also manifest a similar situation, when genital sex does not correspond to the gender identity that the person is developing."

On 9 November 2012, the Legal Medical Service, under the Ministry of Justice, issued Circular 1297 that instructs compliance with the "Expert Technical Guide of Forensic Sexology for trans and intersex cases." It is intended to safeguard the physical and mental integrity of people, especially ensuring the protection of dignity. The protocol mentions that trans and intersex persons will not be subjected to invasive expert reports, in addition they must be treated by their social name or the one that the person prefers.

== See also ==
- Intersex human rights
- LGBT rights in Chile

== Bibliography ==
- Comisión Interamericana de Derechos Humanos (Inter-American Commission on Human Rights ) (November 2015), Violencia contra Personas Lesbianas, Gays, Bisexuales, Trans e Intersex en América (PDF)
- Cabral, Mauro, ed. (February 2009). Interdicciones: Escrituras de la intersexualidad en castellano. Córdoba, Argentina: Mulabi. ISBN 978-987-05-5898-9.
- Godoy, Camillo; Centro de Derechos Humanos UDP (November 2016). Informe Anual sobre Derechos Humanos en Chile 2016 (PDF). Ediciones Universidad Diego Portales. ISBN 978-956-314-374-4. Archived from the original (PDF) on 2 August 2020.
- Guzmán, Claudia (15 March 2016). "Cambiados de Sexo al Nacer". El Mercurio. pp. 30–37. Archived from the original on 7 February 2017.
- "Circular 08, 22.12.15 Instruye Sobre Ciertos Aspectos de la atencion de Salud a Ninos y Ninas Intersex.pdf" (PDF). Ministerio de Salud. 22 December 2015.
- "Complementa circular 18 que instruye sobre ciertos aspectos de la atencion de salud a niños y niñas intersex (Circular 07, 23.08.16)" (PDF). Ministerio de Salud. 23 August 2016.
