= Intersex rights in Argentina =

- Argentina
- Protection of physical integrity and bodily autonomy: No
- Protection from discrimination: No
- Access to identification documents: No
- Changing M/F sex classifications: Yes
- Third gender or sex classifications: Yes
- Marriage: Yes
- Rights by country: Argentina; Australia; Canada; Chile; China; Colombia; France; Germany; Kenya; Malta; Mexico; Nepal; New Zealand; South Africa; Spain; Switzerland; Taiwan; Uganda; United Kingdom; United States

Intersex people in Argentina have no recognition of their rights to physical integrity and bodily autonomy, and no specific protections from discrimination on the basis of sex characteristics. Cases also exist of children being denied access to birth certificates without their parents consenting to medical interventions. The National Institute Against Discrimination, Xenophobia and Racism and civil society organizations such as Justicia Intersex have called for the prohibition of unnecessary medical interventions and access to redress.

== History ==
The first public discussions on intersex issues in Argentina took place in 1995, and in 2005, regional trans and intersex activists first gathered. Argentinian intersex and transgender rights activist Mauro Cabral was a signatory of the Yogyakarta Principles in 2006. A collection of essays, titled Interdicciones was published in 2009.

The first UN report to condemn irreversible and involuntary medical interventions was published by Argentinian Juan E. Méndez, the UN Special Rapporteur on torture, in 2013.

In April 2018, Latin American and Caribbean intersex activists published the San José de Costa Rica statement, defining local demands.

== Physical integrity and bodily autonomy ==
Legal prohibition of non-consensual medical interventions Regulatory suspension of non-consensual medical interventions

In 2013, the UN Special Rapporteur on torture condemned intersex medical interventions intended to “fix" the sex of children born with atypical sex characteristics, finding that this could lead to "permanent, irreversible infertility and causing severe mental suffering". The report stressed the powerlessness of stigmatized groups, and the centrality of informed consent. The report called for the repeal of laws permitting irreversible medical interventions, including coercive genital surgeries and gonadectomies. Similar calls have been made by the Inter-American Commission on Human Rights.

In a 2015 paper, the National Institute Against Discrimination, Xenophobia and Racism (INADI) called for recognition of the rights of intersex people to bodily integrity and autonomy in medical decisions. INADI called for the deferral of medically unnecessary interventions, and access to health for all intersex people regardless of prior medical treatment.

In 2017, a joint submission to the UN Committee Against Torture by Justicia Intersex and Zwischengeschlecht identified a lack of legal protection of rights to physical and mental integrity, and to self-determination, and no measure to ensure data collection and monitoring, accountability or redress. The report stated that provisions on patient and children's rights were not applied to intersex persons, and relevant institutions were supportive of unnecessary medical interventions, or indifferent to them. The report cited a 2010 paper by Argentine pediatric surgeon Marcela Bailez and others that suggested early gonadectomies, even in cases of very low cancer risk, stating that these provide a psychological benefit for parents. It also reported 2016 guidance by the Argentinian Civil Association for Pediatric Surgery calls for "clitoridectomy for intersex status", and multiple research papers by Hospital Gutierrez reporting poor surgical outcomes, lack of sexual desire in post-surgical patients, anxiety and depression. Complications from masculinizing surgeries, medical display, and the use of prenatal treatments are also described.

== Protection from discrimination ==
Explicit protection from discrimination on grounds of sex characteristics Explicit protection on grounds of intersex status Explicit protection on grounds of intersex within attribute of sex

In 2015, the National Institute Against Discrimination, Xenophobia and Racism (INADI) published a report on intersex. The report described sex as a cultural category, based on socially-determined parameters, in addition to being a biological or bodily category. It recommended action to prevent bullying and discrimination on the basis of bodily characteristics in schools, and the development of appropriate educational content.

== Identification documents ==
A 2017 civil society submission to the United Nations Committee Against Torture identified two cases of children denied birth certificates without parental consent to irreversible medical interventions.

The Ley de Género (Gender Law), grants adults sex reassignment surgery and hormone therapy as a part of their public or private health care plans. The law also allows for changes to gender, image, or birth name on civil registries without the approval of a doctor or a judge. The law made Argentina the first country to allow people to change their gender identity without any kind of medical intervention or certification.

The law does not permit a third option, and the possibility of constructing a third option on the basis of biology, or medical treatment, has been criticized by Mauro Cabral Grinspan, stating that an Australian legal case affirmed a correspondence between physical characteristics and gender identity. Cabral has also written that, "People tend to identify a third sex with freedom from the gender binary, but that is not necessarily the case. If only trans and/or intersex people can access that third category, or if they are compulsively assigned to a third sex, then the gender binary gets stronger, not weaker."

== Marriage ==
Upon legalising same-sex marriage on July 15, 2010, Argentina became the first country in Latin America, the second in the Americas, and the tenth in the world to do so.

== See also ==
- Intersex human rights
- LGBT rights in Argentina
- Transgender rights in Argentina

== Bibliography ==
- Comisión Interamericana de Derechos Humanos (Inter-American Commission on Human Rights ) (November 2015), Violencia contra Personas Lesbianas, Gays, Bisexuales, Trans e Intersex en América (PDF)
- Cabral, Mauro, ed. (February 2009). Interdicciones: Escrituras de la intersexualidad en castellano. Córdoba, Argentina: Mulabi. ISBN 978-987-05-5898-9.
- Cabral, Mauro (December 2014). "Tercera posición en materia de género" (PDF). Derechos Humanos. 3 (8): 199–212.
- Mouratin, Pedro (2015). Instituto Nacional contra la Discriminación, la Xenofobia y el Racismo - INADI Documento temático INADI: Intersexualidad (PDF). Ciudad Autónoma de Buenos Aires: Instituto Nacional contra la Discriminación, la Xenofobia y el Racismo (INADI). ISBN 978-987-1629-63-3. Archived from the original (PDF) on 2016-01-13.
- Justicia Intersex; Zwischengeschlecht.org (March 2017). "NGO Report to the 6th and 7th Periodic Report of Argentina on the Convention Against Torture (CAT)" (PDF). Buenos Aires.
