= Intersex rights in Kenya =

- Kenya
- Protection of physical integrity and bodily autonomy: No
- Protection from discrimination: Limited protections
- Access to identification documents: Yes
- Rights by country: Argentina; Australia; Canada; Chile; China; Colombia; France; Germany; Kenya; Malta; Mexico; Nepal; New Zealand; South Africa; Spain; Switzerland; Taiwan; Uganda; United Kingdom; United States

Intersex people in Kenya face significant human rights violations, starting from birth. There are few protections from mutilation and non-consensual cosmetic medical interventions and no legislative protection from discrimination. Intersex persons may have difficulties in obtaining birth certificates and other forms of documentation.

In February 2025, Kenya officially acknowledged intersex individuals within its birth registration process. The Births and Deaths Registration Act was revised to include intersex as a category in official records.

== History ==
Traditionally, children who are identified as having an intersex condition at birth were killed. This is beginning to change, according to midwives and birth attendants' organizations. Surviving intersex children may have difficulties in obtaining birth certificates and other forms of identification.

In December 2017, African intersex activists published a statement setting out local demands.

In August 2018, the Kenya National Commission on Human Rights published a report calling for research and legal reform to protect the rights of intersex persons in Kenya.

== Physical integrity and bodily autonomy ==
Legal prohibition of non-consensual medical interventions Regulatory suspension of non-consensual medical interventions

Reports suggest that the birth of an intersex infant can be regarded as a curse or bad omen, resulting in infanticide. Seline Okiki, chairperson of the organization of birth attendants, Ten Beloved Sisters, has described how babies born intersex are traditionally killed following birth.

In 2015, it was reported that an intersex adolescent from Malindi, Muhadh Ishmael, was mutilated and later died in hospital. He had previously been described as a curse on his family.

In October 2018, the Kenya National Commission on Human Rights reported that some intersex people have been forced to undergo genital surgeries and, in "some cases the procedures were botched resulting in death".

In the same year, two major national reports were published on the situation of intersex people in Kenya: a report by the Kenya National Commission on Human Rights, and a report of a Taskforce on Policy, Legal, Institutional and Administrative Reforms regarding Intersex Persons in Kenya. Both reports called for reform to protect the bodily integrity of intersex persons, and action to tackle stigma.

The Kenya National Commission on Human Rights called for the convening of an intersex health working group, establishing national guidelines for medical practices, and multi-disciplinary teams, and direct doctors to "advise all parents to withhold “normalizing” surgery until children are at an age when they can make a decision for themselves", investigate infanticide and child abuse, research the impact of intersex medical interventions, and fund access to consented medical treatment.

The Taskforce stated that "Surgical and hormonal interventions for children in relation to their intersex status should only be carried out in case of medical emergency based on informed consent". It recommended that the government provide:

- "protection against involuntary and inappropriate medical intervention and ensure effective remedy"
- develop guidelines, and promote access to healthcare, including through a treatment fund and prenatal counselling.

== Protection from discrimination ==
Explicit protection from discrimination on grounds of sex characteristics Explicit protection on grounds of intersex status Explicit protection on grounds of intersex within attribute of sex

Intersex people are considered to suffer significant stigma. A Kenyan news report suggests high rates of early school leaving, with the organisation Gama Africa reporting that 60% of 132 known intersex people had dropped out of school "because of the harassment and treatment they received from their peers and their teachers". Anecdotal reports point to high levels of suicidality amongst intersex people.

In the 2010 case of Richard Muasya v. the Hon. Attorney General, Muasya had been convicted of robbery with violence. The case examined whether or not he had suffered discrimination as a result of being born intersex. He was found to have been subjected to inhuman and degrading treatment while in prison.

Intersex people in Kenya do not currently have protections from discrimination, but the rights of intersex people are currently a matter of discussion, including through a Taskforce led by nominated MP Isaac Mwaura. In part, this followed a landmark court case decided in 2014, of a child who could not commence school without a birth certificate.

A 2018 report by the Kenya National Commission on Human Rights found evidence of widespread stigma and discrimination, including infanticide, lack of birth registration, and high rates of early school leaving. It found that intersex people suffered from myths that intersex people are the products of a "curse", and that intersex people are gay or transgender, and that these myths impaired their right to a fair trial. It called for legal reform to

- Enact a legal definition of intersex that is broader and that recognizes the diversity of intersex variations
- Educate the public
- "Amend and enact legislation that gives effect to the provisions of Article 27(4) of the Constitution so as to guarantee non-discrimination to inter sex persons in all spheres of life, including in: education, health care, employment, sports and access to public services, and address such discrimination through relevant anti-discrimination initiatives"

The Taskforce recommended that the government:

- "ensure equal treatment, respect and protection of the dignity of intersex persons within the criminal justice sector."

== Identification documents ==
In 2014, in the case of Baby ‘A’ (Suing through her Mother E.A) & another v Attorney General & 6 others [2014], a Kenyan court ordered the Kenyan government to issue a birth certificate to a five-year-old child born in 2009 with ambiguous genitalia. In Kenya a birth certificate is necessary for attending school, getting a national identity document, and voting. The child's lawyer, John Chigiti, stated that this was a "first step toward recognizing intersex people".

In an earlier, 2010, High Court case, Richard Muasya v. the Hon. Attorney General, the Court had determined that an intersex person was responsible for registering his own birth, following a failure to do so at the time of his birth.

The report of the Kenya National Commission on Human Rights stated that children should not be assigned to a third sex category but that the government should "implement the approach advocated by intersex groups known as the “non-surgical best guess approach”" and "allow intersex persons to change their legal name and gender on all of their identity documents." The Taskforce proposed creation of a third sex category for intersex people, "to facilitate recognition of intersex persons in the law".

== Sport ==
In May 2019, news organizations reported that two women athletes were dropped from the national athletics team, following the decision of the Court of Arbitration for Sport in the case of Caster Semenya. The athletes are 100m and 200m champion Maximilla Imali and 400m runner Evangeline Makena.

== Rights advocacy ==
Intersex organizations in Kenya include Intersex Persons Society of Kenya, and Jinsiangu/Jinsi Yangu. Both organizations were acknowledged as key Non-State institutions in the Taskforce report, along with Gender Minority Advocacy Trust.

Intersex Awareness Day was first marked in Kenya in 2016. A march in Nairobi was organized by Gama Africa, along with petition presented to parliament and events organized by the Kenya National Commission on Human Rights.

In 2017, work commenced on a "Model Law on the rights of intersex persons in Africa". A first consultation meeting took place at the Centre for Human Rights at the University of Pretoria, in South Africa. Kenyan representatives included John Chigiti of Gender Minorities Action Trust Foundation-Kenya (GMAT), who represented intersex persons in 2010 and 2014 High Court cases.

== See also ==
- Intersex human rights
- LGBT rights in Kenya
- Human rights in Kenya

== Bibliography ==
- Kenya National Commission on Human Rights (August 2018), Equal in Dignity and Rights: Promoting The Rights of Intersex Persons In Kenya, Nairobi, ISBN 978-9966-040-49-7
- Office of the Attorney General and Department of Justice (2018), Report of the Taskforce on Policy, Legal, Institutional and Administrative Reforms regarding Intersex Persons in Kenya
- Grady, Helen; Soy, Anne (May 4, 2017). "The midwife who saved intersex babies". BBC World Service, Kenya.
- International Commission of Jurists (2010). "Richard Muasya v. the Hon. Attorney General, High Court of Kenya (2 December 2010)". International Commission of Jurists.
- High Court of Kenya (December 5, 2014), Baby 'A' (Suing through her Mother E.A) & another v Attorney General & 6 others [2014], Nairobi: High Court of Kenya
