= Intersex rights in Uganda =

- Uganda
- Protection of physical integrity and bodily autonomy: No
- Protection from discrimination: No
- Changing M/F sex classifications: Yes (children only)
- Rights by country: Argentina; Australia; Canada; Chile; China; Colombia; France; Germany; Kenya; Malta; Mexico; Nepal; New Zealand; South Africa; Spain; Switzerland; Taiwan; Uganda; United Kingdom; United States

Intersex people in Uganda face a dangerous environment, with significant gaps in protection from mutilation and non-consensual cosmetic medical interventions and protection from discrimination.

== History ==
Traditionally, children who are identified as having an intersex condition at birth were killed, and mothers may be accused of witchcraft. This is beginning to change, with the help of intersex civil society organizations like SIPD Uganda, but stigma, violence, abuse and exploitation still persist.

In December 2017, African intersex activists published a statement setting out local demands.

== Physical integrity and bodily autonomy ==
Legal prohibition of non-consensual medical interventions Regulatory suspension of non-consensual medical interventions

Reports suggest that the birth of an intersex infant can be regarded as a curse or bad omen, resulting in infanticide, neglect, and the stigmatization of the mother. Mothers may even be expelled from their community, and intersex children may be separated from siblings.

Intersex persons may experience coercive medical interventions, in medical settings and outside medical settings. However, intersex persons who require medical attention may also have difficulties accessing necessary treatment.

A 2014 Civil Society Coalition on Human Rights and Constitutional Law report identified multiple cases where surgeries and medical interventions led to human rights abuses. In one case, surgery conducted by medical practitioners without family consent led to the child having health problems and dropping out of school. In another case, a child was abandoned at hospital after genital surgery because of the cost of treatment. The hospital discontinued his treatment.

Sam Lyomoki, a Ugandan MP and a doctor, has stated that the parliament "issued guidelines in 2015 to the Ministry of Health advising against surgical intervention for intersex infants", however, "Local radio stations in Uganda buzz with appeals seeking donors to help fund genital reshaping surgery abroad" and surgeries are also carried out within Uganda. Local organization SIPD Uganda "advocates for the 'best guess' non-surgical approach where an intersex child should be raised in the best-suited gender, without irreversible surgical intervention, until they can be active participants in the decision".

== Protection from discrimination ==
Explicit protection from discrimination on grounds of sex characteristics Explicit protection on grounds of intersex status Explicit protection on grounds of intersex within attribute of sex

The constitution of Uganda provides for recognition of fundamental rights and freedoms, equality and non-discrimination, privacy, education and affirmative action. The African Charter on the rights and welfare of the African child commits member countries, including Uganda, to the protection of all children – including intersex children – against social, economic, cultural and political abuse and exploitation. In practice, intersex persons remain subject to violence, discrimination and abuse.

In research by SIPD Uganda, 90% of intersex youth reported that they were forced to drop out of school because of the immense stigma and discrimination associated with the non-binary development of their intersex body."

== Identification documents ==
The Registration of Persons Act 2015 allows for the updating of an intersex child's registration details in the event of a medically certified sex change. Specifically, if a child is born a "hermaphrodite" and, following registration, undergoes an operation, their registered sex may be changed from male to female or from female to male. Changes of name can create social problems, and the situation of adults is uncertain. Many intersex persons are understood to be stateless due to historical difficulties in obtaining identification documents.

== Rights advocacy ==
SIPD Uganda has called for recognition of the human rights of intersex people in Uganda, and in the East African region, including protection from harmful surgeries, access to care, protection from discrimination and abuse, and access to education and employment. SIPD Uganda has worked with some 700 intersex persons in the 25 Ugandan administrative districts where it delivers services. The organization also convened a 2014 regional meeting of intersex advocates allies from Rwanda, Burundi, Kenya, Congo, Tanzania, and Uganda.

Intersex is commonly confused with being lesbian or gay, and this has consequences for organizing and disclosure, as well as discrimination towards intersex persons. Julius Kaggwa, the executive director of SIPD, describes the situation in Uganda as dangerous.

== See also ==
- Intersex human rights
- Human rights in Uganda
- LGBT rights in Uganda

== Bibliography ==
- Support Initiative for Persons with Congenital Disorders (2016). "Baseline Survey on Intersex Realities in East Africa - Specific Focus on Uganda, Kenya and Rwanda" (PDF). Archived from the original (PDF) on 2017-09-26.
- Civil Society Coalition on Human Rights and Constitutional Law; Human Rights Awareness and Promotion Forum; Rainbow Health Foundation; Sexual Minorities Uganda; Support Initiative for Persons with Congenital Disorders (2014). "Uganda Report of Violations based on Sex Determination, Gender Identity, and Sexual Orientation". Archived from the original on 2015-05-03.
- Kakande, Yasin (December 18, 2016). "In Uganda, parents seek controversial genital surgery for 'intersex' babies". Thomson Reuters Foundation News.
- "Becoming Julius: Growing up intersex in Uganda". BBC News. February 26, 2017.
