= Intersex rights in Malta =

- Location of Malta (dark green) – in Europe (light green & dark grey) – in the European Union (light green) – [Legend]
- Protection of physical integrity and bodily autonomy: Yes
- Protection from discrimination: Yes
- Access to identification documents: Yes
- Access to same rights as other men and women: Yes
- Changing M/F sex classifications: Yes
- Third gender or sex classifications: Yes
- Marriage: Yes
- Rights by country: Argentina; Australia; Canada; Chile; China; Colombia; France; Germany; Kenya; Malta; Mexico; Nepal; New Zealand; South Africa; Spain; Switzerland; Taiwan; Uganda; United Kingdom; United States

Intersex rights in Malta since 2015 are among the most progressive in the world. Intersex children in Malta have world-first protections from non-consensual cosmetic medical interventions, following the passing into law of the Gender Identity, Gender Expression and Sex Characteristics Act in 2015. All Maltese intersex persons have protection from discrimination. Individuals who seek it can access simple administrative methods of changing sex assignment, with binary and non-binary forms of identification available.

== History ==
=== Medieval ===
A 12th-century canon law collection known as the Decretum Gratiani states that "Whether an hermaphrodite may witness a testament, depends on which sex prevails" (Hermafroditus an ad testamentum adhiberi possit, qualitas sexus incalescentis ostendit).

=== Early modern period ===
In a court case heard at the Castellania in 1774 during the Order of St John in Malta, 17-year-old Rosa Mifsud from Luqa, later described in clinical literature as a "pseudo-hermaphrodite", petitioned for a change in sex classification from female. Two clinicians were appointed by the court to perform an examination. They found that "the male sex is the dominant one". The examiners were the Physician-in-Chief and a senior surgeon, both working at the Sacra Infermeria. The Grandmaster himself took the final decision for Mifsud to wear male-only clothes from then on.

=== Contemporary times ===
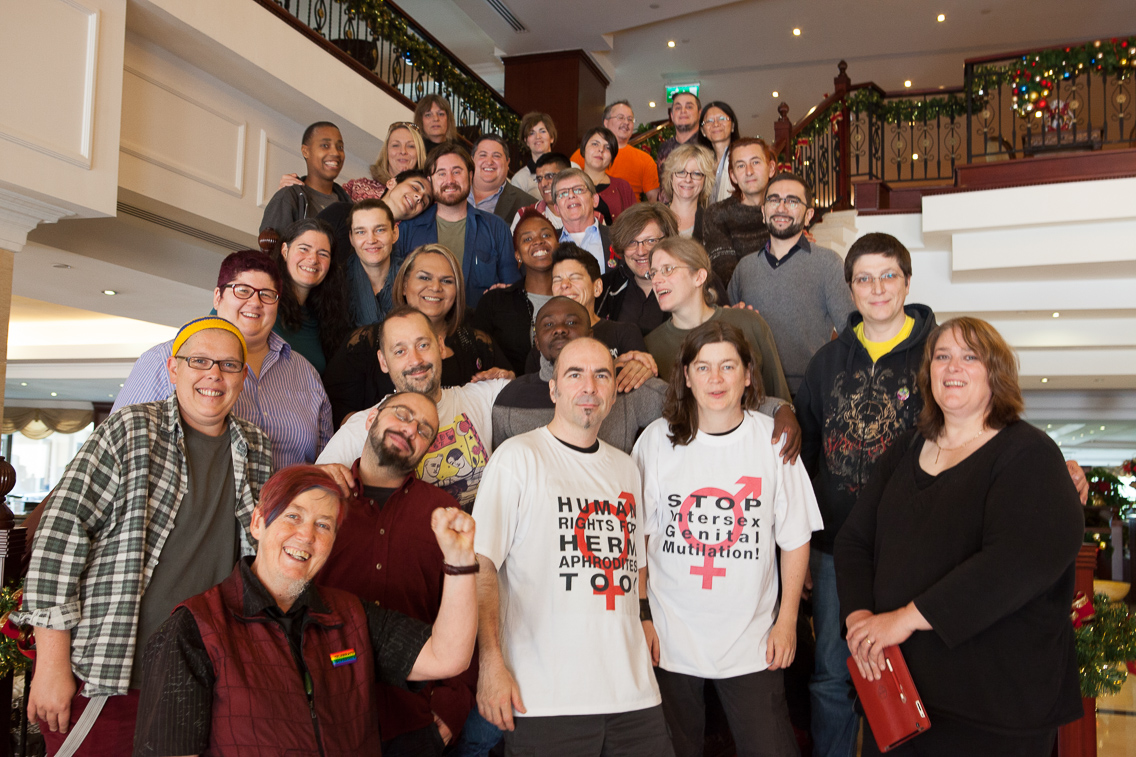
Participants at the Third International Intersex Forum where the Malta declaration was made, December 2013

In 2013, Malta hosted the third International Intersex Forum in Valletta, where a civil society statement named the Malta declaration was signed. The event was supported by ILGA and ILGA-Europe, and brought together 34 people representing 30 organisations from multiple regions of the world. Local representatives Silvan Agius of ILGA-Europe and Ruth Baldacchino of ILGA hosted and co-organized the event. The declaration affirmed the existence of intersex people, and demanded an end to "discrimination against intersex people and to ensure the right of bodily integrity, physical autonomy and self-determination". Silvan Agius subsequently became human rights policy coordinator at the Ministry for Social Dialogue, and Ruth Baldacchino became co-secretary general of ILGA.

In 2015, Malta adopted world-first protections for intersex people, including protection from non-consensual cosmetic changes to sex characteristics in childhood, and protection from discrimination.

== Physical integrity and bodily autonomy ==
Legal prohibition of non-consensual medical interventions Regulatory suspension or limitation of harmful practices Legal prohibition in at least one state/province Physical integrity and bodily autonomy on intersex not legislated

In April 2015, Malta passed world-first legislation that protects intersex infants and children from non-consensual medical interventions. The Gender Identity Gender Expression and Sex Characteristics Act recognizes a right to bodily integrity and physical autonomy.

14. (1) It shall be unlawful for medical practitioners or other professionals to conduct any sex assignment treatment and/or surgical intervention on the sex characteristics of a minor which treatment and/or intervention can be deferred until the person to be treated can provide informed consent:

Provided that such sex assignment treatment and/or surgical intervention on the sex characteristics of the minor shall be conducted if the minor gives informed consent through the person exercising parental authority or the tutor of the minor.

(2) In exceptional circumstances treatment may be effected once agreement is reached between the interdisciplinary team and the persons exercising parental authority or tutor of the minor who is still unable to provide consent:

Provided that medical intervention which is driven by social factors without the consent of the minor, will be in violation of this Act.

The Act was widely welcomed internationally by civil society organizations.

== Protection from discrimination ==
Explicit protection from discrimination on grounds of sex characteristics Explicit protection on grounds of intersex status Explicit protection on grounds of intersex within attribute of sex

The 2015 Gender Identity Gender Expression and Sex Characteristics Act protects intersex people from discrimination on grounds of "sex characteristics", as well as offering world-first protection from harmful practices. Sex characteristics was defined as follows:

"sex characteristics" refers to the chromosomal, gonadal and anatomical features of a person, which include primary characteristics such as reproductive organs and genitalia and/or in chromosomal structures and hormones; and secondary characteristics such as muscle mass, hair distribution, breasts and/or structure.

Also in 2015, the Ministry for Education and Employment introduced a policy for trans, gender variant and intersex students in schools, aiming to promote inclusion and combat discrimination.

== Identification documents ==
The same Gender Identity Gender Expression and Sex Characteristics Act introduced new provisions allowing applicants to change their gender identity documents by a simple administrative method. Malta also permits an "X" option on identification documents since 6 September 2017. The first ID card and passport with "X" marker were issued on 23 January 2018.

== Marriage ==
Legislation to enact marriage equality was introduced following a snap election in mid-2017. It went into effect on 1 September 2017.

== See also ==
- Malta declaration
- Human rights in Malta
- Intersex human rights
- LGBT rights in Malta

== Bibliography ==
- Commissioner for Human Rights; Council of Europe (April 2015), Human rights and intersex people, Issue Paper
- Malta (April 2015), Gender Identity, Gender Expression and Sex Characteristics Act: Final version
- Ministry for Education and Employment (June 2015), Trans, Gender Variant and Intersex Students in Schools: Policy (PDF), archived from the original (PDF) on 14 April 2016
