= Intersex rights in Germany =

Overview of intersex people's rights in Germany

- Location of Germany (dark green) – in Europe (light green & dark grey) – in the European Union (light green) – [Legend]
- Protection of physical integrity and bodily autonomy: Yes, with loopholes
- Protection from discrimination: Yes
- Changing M/F sex classifications: Yes
- Third gender or sex classifications: Yes (since December 2018)
- Marriage: Yes (since 1 October 2017)
- Rights by country: Argentina; Australia; Canada; Chile; China; Colombia; France; Germany; Kenya; Malta; Mexico; Nepal; New Zealand; South Africa; Spain; Switzerland; Taiwan; Uganda; United Kingdom; United States

Intersex people in Germany have legal recognition of their rights to physical integrity and bodily autonomy, with exceptions, but no specific protections from discrimination on the basis of sex characteristics. In response to an inquiry by the German Ethics Council in 2012, the government passed legislation in 2013 designed to classify some intersex infants as a de facto third category. The legislation has been criticized by civil society and human rights organizations as misguided.

Research published in 2016 found no substantive reduction in the numbers of intersex medical interventions for infants and children with intersex conditions in the period from 2005 to 2014. In 2021, the Bundestag (the German parliament) passed legal protections, albeit protections that have been criticized due to exceptions to the law.

== History ==
The 12th-century canon law collection known as the Decretum Gratiani states that "Whether a hermaphrodite may witness a testament, depends on which sex prevails" ("Hermaphroditus an ad testamentum adhiberi possit, qualitas sexus incalescentis ostendit."). On ordainment, Raming, Macy and Cook found that the Decretum Gratiani states, "item Hermafroditus. If therefore the person is drawn to the feminine more than the male, the person does not receive the order. If the reverse, the person is able to receive but ought not to be ordained on account of deformity and monstrosity." Historical accounts of intersex people are scarce, but 19th-century medical journals document Gottlieb Göttlich, a man who made a living from being studied by medical practitioners, and Karl Dürrge. Dürrge also made his living as a medical subject, but his life also illustrates the historical legal tradition. Assigned female at birth, Dürrge changed name and designation to male as an adult, in line with Articles 19-24 of the Prussian Code of 1792, which enabled hermaphrodites to choose to live as either male or female from the age of majority.

In the 20th century, the term intersex was coined by the German-born geneticist Richard Goldschmidt. In 1932 gynecologist and obstetrician Hans Naujoks performed what was described as the first complete and comprehensive intersex surgery and hormone treatment on a patient with both ovarian and testicular tissue, at the University of Marburg. The female patient was described as fully functional after surgery and, starting in 1934, spontaneously menstruated.

=== Nazi Germany ===
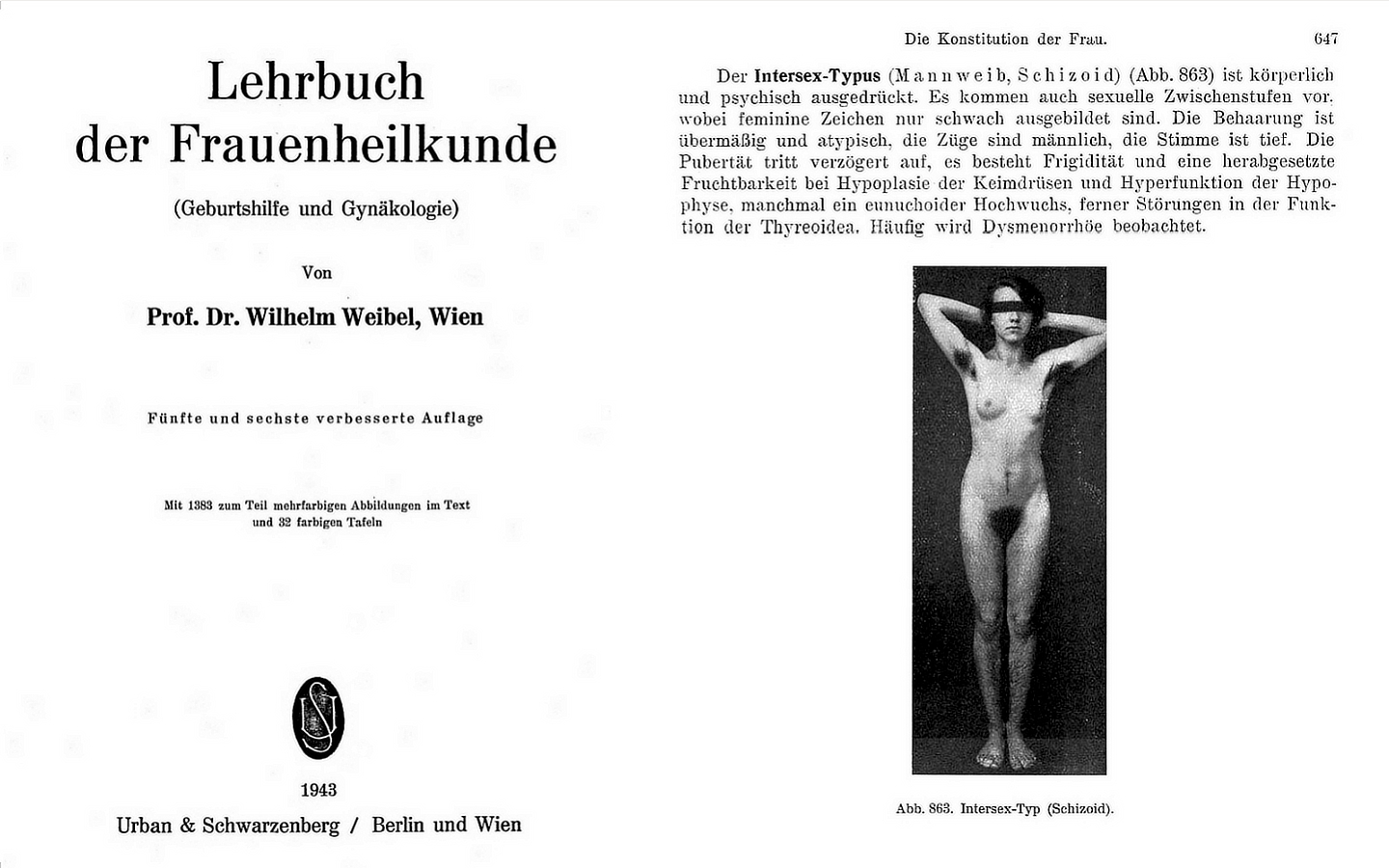
A pseudo-diagnosis from Nazi Germany in 1943. The text reads: "The intersex type is physical and psychologically expressed. There are also sexual intermediate stages, where female characteristics are only weakly developed. Hair growth is excessive and atypical, the features are male, the voice is deep. Puberty occurs with delay, there is frigidity and reduced fertility in the case of hypoplasia of the gonads and hyperfunction of the pituitary gland, sometimes eunuch-like tall stature, also disorders in the function of the thyroid gland. Often dysmenorrhea is observed."

During Nazi rule in Germany, many intersex people were either killed or hidden from the public. German athlete Dora Ratjen competed in the 1936 Olympic Games in Berlin, placing fourth in the women's high jump. She later competed and set a world record for the women's high jump at the 1938 European Championships. Raised as a girl, tests by the German police concluded that Ratjen was a man. Ratjen later took the name Heinrich Ratjen following an official registry change. Formal sex verification testing was controversially later introduced in sport. Time magazine later reported that Ratjen tearfully confessed that he had been forced by the Nazis to pose as a woman "for the sake of the honor and glory of Germany".

=== Post World War II ===
In the 21st century, legal cases by Christiane Völling and Michaela Raab, provide first and later examples of successful legal action against coercive intersex medical interventions.

Also in this century, Germany introduced what may be the first form of third gender recognition in Europe, albeit controversially as a requirement for some intersex infants and otherwise not available. This was introduced as a measure to prevent early intersex medical interventions, but intersex civil society organizations fear that it will encourage such interventions, and there is no evidence of reductions in surgery numbers.

Civil society organizations, including Intergeschlechtliche Menschen, OII Germany and Zwischengeschlecht, have submitted reports to Land, federal and international human rights institutions.

In the spring of 1999, Heike Bödeker coined the term endosex, as an opposite or antonym for the term intersex.

== Physical integrity and bodily autonomy ==
Legal prohibition of non-consensual medical interventions Regulatory suspension of non-consensual medical interventions

The organization Intersexuelle Menschen first submitted a Shadow Report to the United Nations Committee on the Elimination of All Forms of Discrimination Against Women (CEDAW) in July 2008, detailing human rights violations in medical settings and failures to act in the best interests of the child.

In 2010, the German Ethics Council was instructed to review the situation of intersex people in Germany following a demand by CEDAW to protect the human rights of intersex persons. A 2012 report by the German Ethics Council stated that, "Many people who were subjected to a 'normalizing' operation in their childhood have later felt it to have been a mutilation and would never have agreed to it as adults." Legislation was subsequently passed to assign infants who could not be determined as male or female to a de facto third classification.

Research published by Ulrike Klöppel at the Humboldt University in December 2016 shows that, over the period 2005 to 2014, there were no significant trends in numbers of intersex medical interventions. An average of 99 feminizing surgeries took place each year, with a change only to the types of medical classification adopted. Rising numbers of masculinizing surgeries took place, exceeding 1600 per year. Between 10 and 16% of children diagnosed with hypospadias underwent a plastic reconstruction of the penis.

In a hearing of the United Nations Committee on the Elimination of Discrimination against Women, German government stated that irreversible medical interventions were permissible where they are "a life-saving procedure, or the best interest of the child, for example if a child was suicidal."

In 2017, Amnesty International published a report condemning "non-emergency, invasive and irreversible medical treatment with harmful effects" on children born with variations of sex characteristics in Germany and Denmark. It found that surgeries take place with limited psychosocial support, based on gender stereotypes, but without firm evidence. Amnesty International reported that "there are no binding guidelines for the treatment of intersex children".

=== Legal protections, 2021 ===
A law that provides for a general ban on operations in children and adolescents with 'variations of sex development' ('Varianten der Geschlechtsentwicklung') was passed in the German parliament on 25 March 2021. According to a report in the Deutsches Ärzteblatt, the law is intended to strengthen the self-determined decision-making of children and adolescents and avoid possible damage to their health. Surgical changes to sex characteristics should only take place - even with the consent of the parents - if the operation cannot be postponed until age 14. The majority of legal scholars and psychologists consulted support the approach. The Federal Chamber of Psychotherapists requires the mandatory participation of a counsellor with experience in intersex in an assessment before a possible intervention. While supportive of progress, the law that was finally passed was criticized by the Organisation Intersex International (OII) Germany, OII Europe, and Intergeschlechtliche Menschen e.V., because they provide too many exceptions. Whether the protection takes hold in an individual case depends on whether the medical professional diagnoses the child with variations of sex development (the German implementation of disorders of sex development) or not.

== Remedies and claims for compensation ==
Explicit protection from discrimination on grounds of sex characteristics Explicit protection on grounds of intersex status Explicit protection on grounds of intersex within attribute of sex

Two legal cases seeking compensation for "unwanted, harmful medical interventions" have succeeded, those of Christiane Völling and Michaela Raab. Both were adults at the time of the medical interventions. There appear to be no statutory provisions offering compensation, however, at a hearing of the United Nations Committee on the Elimination of Discrimination against Women in February 2017, the German government said that a compensation fund for victims of intersex genital mutilation is under discussion.

=== Christiane Völling case ===
In Germany in 2011, Christiane Völling won what may be the first successful case against non-consensual "normalizing" medical treatment. The surgeon was ordered to pay €100,000 in damages after a legal battle that began in 2007, thirty years after the removal of her reproductive organs.

=== Michaela Raab case ===
In 2015, Michaela Raab sued doctors in Nuremberg, Germany, who failed to properly advise her. Doctors stated that they "were only acting according to the norms of the time - which sought to protect patients against the psychosocial effects of learning the full truth about their chromosomes". On 17 December 2015, the Nuremberg State Court ruled that the University of Erlangen-Nuremberg Clinic must pay damages and compensation.

== Identification documents ==
Nonbinary / third gender available as voluntary opt-in Opt-in for intersex people only Mandatory for some born intersex, and opt in Mandatory for some born intersex Nonbinary / third gender not legally recognized / no data

In November 2013, Germany became the first European country to allow "indeterminate" sex, requiring this where a child may not be assigned male or female. This was criticized by intersex civil society organizations such as OII Germany and Zwischengeschlecht who argued that "if a child's anatomy does not, in the view of physicians, conform to the category of male or the category of female, there is no option but to withhold the male or female labels given to all other children." The German Ethics Council and the Swiss National Advisory Commission also criticized the law, saying that "instead of individuals deciding for themselves at maturity, decisions concerning sex assignment are made in infancy by physicians and parents."

Many intersex advocates in Germany and elsewhere have suggested that the law might encourage surgical interventions, rather than reduce them. The Council of Europe Issue Paper on intersex restates these concerns:

Human rights practitioners fear that the lack of freedom of choice regarding the entry in the gender marker field may now lead to an increase in stigmatisation and to "forced outings" of those children whose sex remains undetermined. This has raised the concern that the law may also lead to an increase in pressure on parents of intersex children to decide in favour of one sex.

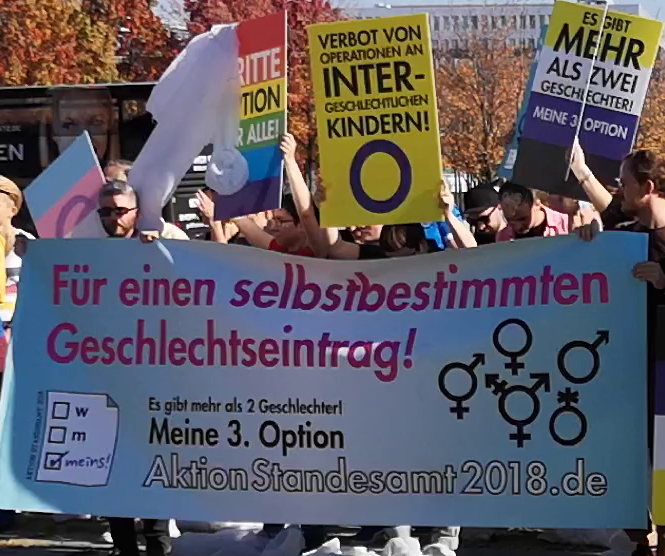
13 October 2018: protest for third gender in front of the Bundeskanzleramt

In June 2016, Germany's High Court ruled that German law would not allow entry of a third option of "inter" or "diverse" in the birth registry. The High Court said it found no violation of the plaintiff's basic rights since intersex people have been able since 2013 to leave the gender entry in German birth registries blank. In November 2017, the German Constitutional Court ruled that civil status law must allow a third gender option. Open sex entries don't "reflect that the complainant does not see themself as a genderless person, but rather perceives themself as having a gender beyond male or female". This ruling was followed in August 2018 by a cabinet decision to create a new sex classification, "diverse", for intersex people only. This has been criticized for failing to address concerns about medical interventions, and for failing to make this non-binary gender category available to non-intersex people. The proposal was approved by the Bundestag in December 2018. On 22 December 2018, the adopted act entered into force, allowing the choice for intersex people (both at birth and at a later age) between "female", "male", "diverse" and no gender marker at all. In case of a change later in life, first names can also be changed. In the meantime, an appeals court had held that a nonbinary status must also be open to non-intersex non-binary people; the adopted act does not address this category of people and their situation therefore remains unclear pending additional case-law.

== Marriage ==
Since 2017, persons classified as neither male nor female (or intersex people) can legally marry another person of any sex/gender within Germany. Since 1 October 2017, same-sex marriage became legal within Germany and registered partnerships that had been legally available since 2001, were abolished. Same-sex step adoption has also been legal since 2005 and was expanded in 2013 to allow someone in a same-sex relationship to adopt a child already adopted by their partner and full adoption rights for same-sex couples has been legally available since 1 October 2017 within Germany.

== See also ==
- German passport
- Intersex human rights
- OII Germany
- Zwischengeschlecht
- LGBT rights in Germany
- Transgender rights in Germany
- Human rights in Germany

== Bibliography ==
- Intersexuelle Menschen (July 2008). "Shadow Report To the 6th National Report of the Federal Republic of Germany On the United Nations Convention on the Elimination of All Forms of Discrimination Against Women (CEDAW)" (PDF). Hamburg.
- German Ethics Council (February 2012). Intersexuality, Opinion. ISBN 978-3-941957-50-3. Archived from the original on 2017-04-21.
- International Commission of Jurists. "In re Völling, Regional Court Cologne, Germany (6 February 2008)".
- Klöppel, Ulrike (December 2016). "Zur Aktualität kosmetischer Operationen "uneindeutiger" Genitalien im Kindesalter". Gender Bulletin (in German) (42). Humboldt University. ISSN 0947-6822. Archived from the original on 2017-02-04.
- Kromminga, Ins A; Blaine; Klöppel, Ulrike (December 2009). "Intergeschlechtlichkeit ist kein medizinisches Problem!" (PDF). Gen-Ethische Informationsdienst (in German) (9).
- OII Germany (January 20, 2017). "OII Germany: CEDAW Shadow Report. With reference to the combined Seventh and Eighth Periodic Report from the Federal Republic of Germany on the Convention on the Elimination of All Forms of Discrimination against Women (CEDAW)" (PDF). Archived from the original (PDF) on February 11, 2017.
- von Neugebauer, Franz Ludwig (1908). Hermaphroditismus beim Menschen (in German). Leipzig: Dr Werner Klinkhardt. OL 25266971M.
- Zwischengeschlecht.org (March 2015). Intersex Genital Mutilations Human Rights Violations Of Children With Variations Of Sex Anatomy: NGO Report on the Answers to the List of Issues (LoI) in Relation to the Initial Periodic Report of Germany on the Convention on the Rights of Persons with Disabilities (CRPD) (PDF). Zurich.
