= Intersex rights in China =

Overview of intersex people's rights in China

- Location of the People's Republic of China
- Protection of physical integrity and bodily autonomy: No
- Protection from discrimination: No
- Rights by country: Argentina; Australia; Canada; Chile; China; Colombia; France; Germany; Kenya; Malta; Mexico; Nepal; New Zealand; South Africa; Spain; Switzerland; Taiwan; Uganda; United Kingdom; United States

Intersex rights in China including the People's Republic of China, the Hong Kong Special Administrative Region, etc., are protections and rights afforded to intersex people through legislation and regulation. Obligations also arise in United Nations member states that sign international human rights treaties, such as the People's Republic of China. Intersex people in China suffer discrimination. Issues include both lack of access to health care and coercive genital surgeries.

== History ==
In February 2018, Asian intersex activists published the Statement of Intersex Asia and the Asian Intersex Forum, setting out local demands.

== Physical integrity and bodily autonomy ==
Legal prohibition of non-consensual medical interventions Regulatory suspension of non-consensual medical interventions

Small Luk (Hong Kong) describes traditional Chinese society as patriarchal, promoting the sex assignment of intersex children as boys wherever possible. She states that the "one-child policy" in mainland China led to the abandonment, neglect and deaths of many intersex infants.

Both Luk and Taiwan activist Hiker Chiu have disclosed personal histories involving unwanted medical interventions. Chiu says that surgical "normalisation" practices began in Taiwan in 1953. Intersex medical interventions are encouraged as early as possible in both Hong Kong and the People's Republic. A 2014 clinical review of 22 infants with congenital adrenal hyperplasia in Hong Kong, for example, shows that all infants in the study received clitorectomies. It also showed a preference for early surgeries when infants are aged 1–2 years, and an assessment of surgical success focusing on genital appearance and necessity for further cosmetic surgeries.

The cost of medical interventions in the People's Republic of China makes medical treatment inaccessible, resulting in fewer coercive interventions but exacerbating health issues for some individuals, and issues of abandonment and violence.

In a submission to the United Nations Committee Against Torture in 2015, Beyond the Boundary - Knowing and Concerns Intersex raised concerns about lack of self-determination in Hong Kong and China, forced medical interventions in Hong Kong, lack of government assistance and marriage rights, and problems with violence and discrimination. In a response to submissions for Hong Kong, the United Nations Committee published recommendations calling for the postponement of "non-urgent, irreversible medical interventions" until children are old enough to provide full, free and informed consent. The committee called for an investigation into forced, involuntary and coercive practices in the People's Republic, along with measures to protect the autonomy and "physical and personal integrity of LGBTI persons".

== Protection from discrimination ==
Explicit protection from discrimination on grounds of sex characteristics Explicit protection on grounds of intersex status Explicit protection on grounds of intersex within attribute of sex

Press reports in 2015 and 2016 have provided examples of abandonment, neglect and even attempted murder. The South China Morning Post reported the abandonment of an intersex baby in a park in Shandong province in mid-2015, followed by allegations of attempts to murder an intersex infant as a "monster", in Henan province, in mid-2016.

In 2017, the Hong Kong Equal Opportunities Commission together with the Gender Research Centre of the Hong Kong Institute of Asia-Pacific Studies at the Chinese University of Hong Kong asked the Hong Kong government to introduce legislation offering protection against discrimination on the grounds of sexual orientation, gender identity and intersex status.

== Remedies and claims for compensation ==
The United Nations Committee Against Torture has called for compensation for involuntary and medically unnecessary medical interventions in both the People's Republic of China and Hong Kong.

== Identification documents ==
Small Luk has campaigned for self-determination of gender identity, and also for third gender recognition in Hong Kong.

== Rights advocacy in Greater China region ==
The first people to publicly disclose being intersex were Hiker Chiu of Oii-Chinese, based in Taiwan and founded in 2008, and Small Luk of Beyond the Boundary - Knowing and Concerns Intersex, Hong Kong, founded in 2011.

Chiu started a "free hugs with intersex" campaign at Taipei's LGBT Pride Parade in 2010. Oii-Chinese also gives lectures and lobbies government. The aims of Beyond the Boundary - Knowing and Concerns Intersex are to raise public awareness about intersex people and promote the rights of intersex people, including ending forced genital normalising surgery and conversion therapies. Luk urges the Hong Kong government to educate the public about intersex conditions, extend anti-discrimination laws to cover intersex people and stop foisting surgery on intersex children without consulting them.

== See also ==
- Oii-Chinese
- Intersex rights in Taiwan
- Intersex human rights
- LGBT rights in China
- Transgender in China

== Bibliography ==
- Beyond the Boundary - Knowing and Concerns Intersex (October 2015). "Intersex report from Hong Kong China, and for the UN Committee Against Torture: the Convention against Torture and Other Cruel Inhuman or Degrading Treatment or Punishment".
- United Nations; Office of the High Commissioner for Human Rights (2015). "Free & Equal Campaign Fact Sheet: Intersex" (PDF) (in Chinese).
- United Nations; Committee against Torture (2015). "Concluding observations on the fifth periodic report of China". Geneva: United Nations.
- United Nations; Committee against Torture (2015). "Concluding observations on the fifth periodic report of China with respect to the Hong Kong Special Administrative Region". Geneva: United Nations.
