= Intersex rights in South Africa =

Overview of intersex people's rights in South Africa

- South Africa
- Protection of physical integrity and bodily autonomy: No
- Protection from discrimination: Yes
- Changing M/F sex classifications: Yes
- Marriage: Yes
- Rights by country: Argentina; Australia; Canada; Chile; China; Colombia; France; Germany; Kenya; Malta; Mexico; Nepal; New Zealand; South Africa; Spain; Switzerland; Taiwan; Uganda; United Kingdom; United States

Intersex people in South Africa have some of the same rights as other people, but with significant gaps in protection from non-consensual cosmetic medical interventions and protection from discrimination. The country was the first to explicitly include intersex people in anti-discrimination law.

== History ==
Early and prominent intersex activists include Sally Gross and Nthabiseng Mokoena. Gross, an anti-apartheid and intersex activist, was a founder of Intersex South Africa, an autonomous intersex community organisation affiliated with Organisation Intersex International.

In 2000, Gross helped to secure the first known mention of intersex in national law, with the inclusion of "intersex" within the definition of "sex" in the anti-discrimination law of the Republic of South Africa. Subsequently, she helped to draft legislation on the Alteration of Sex Descriptors, and the Promotion of Equality.

In December 2017, African intersex activists published a statement setting out local demands.

== Physical integrity and bodily autonomy ==
Legal prohibition of non-consensual medical interventions Regulatory suspension or limitation of harmful practices Legal prohibition in at least one state/province Physical integrity and bodily autonomy on intersex not legislated

In 2016, the African Commission on Human and Peoples' Rights joined other human rights institutions in condemning human rights violations on intersex people, including in medical settings. In 2016, the United Nations Committee on the Rights of the Child issued recommendations to guarantee bodily integrity and self-determination of intersex and other children, and ensure sanctions on perpetrators of harmful practices. The South African government acknowledged that such practices occur in the country.

== Protection from discrimination ==
Explicit protection from discrimination on grounds of sex characteristics Explicit protection on grounds of intersex status Explicit protection on grounds of intersex within attribute of sex

In South Africa, the Judicial Matters Amendment Act, 2005 (Act 22 of 2005) amended the Promotion of Equality and Prevention of Unfair Discrimination Act, 2000 (Act 4 of 2000) to include intersex within its definition of sex. Sex is one of the prohibited grounds under the act, which means that discrimination on the basis of sex is presumed to be unfair, and therefore prohibited, unless proven otherwise. The act provides that:

'intersex' means a congenital sexual differentiation which is atypical, to whatever degree; 'sex' includes intersex;

— Act 4 of 2000, section 1, as amended

It is not known whether or not Caster Semenya has an intersex condition. However, the controversy surrounding her treatment and sex verification tests has made her a cause célèbre. Prominent South African civic leaders, commentators, politicians, and activists characterised the controversy as racist, as well as an affront to Semenya's privacy and human rights.

== Identification documents ==
The Alteration of Sex Description and Sex Status Act, 2003 (Act 49 of 2003) allows intersex people to change the sex recorded on their official documents. An applicant must submit a medical report indicating that they are intersex as well as a report from a psychologist or social worker indicating that they have lived for at least two years in the corresponding gender role.

== Marriage ==
All couples can marry in South Africa, regardless of their characteristics. On 1 December 2005, in the case of Minister of Home Affairs v Fourie, the Constitutional Court ruled that it was unconstitutional for the state to deny to same-sex couples the ability to marry, and gave Parliament one year in which to rectify the situation. On 30 November 2006 the Civil Union Act came into force; despite its title it does provide for same-sex marriages.

== Rights advocacy ==
In 2017, work commenced on a "Model Law on the rights of intersex persons in Africa". A first consultation meeting took place at the Centre for Human Rights at the University of Pretoria.

== See also ==
- LGBT rights in South Africa
- Human rights in South Africa

== Bibliography ==
- Gross, Sally (21 February 2000). "The journey from Selwyn to Sally" (PDF). The Witness.
- Mokoena, Nthabiseng (October 2015), "Remembering Sally, and the intersex movement in South Africa", Intersex Day
