= Intersex rights in Spain =

Overview of intersex people's rights in Spain

- Location of Spain (dark green) – in Europe (light green & dark grey) – in the European Union (light green) – [Legend]
- Protection of physical integrity and bodily autonomy: In some regions
- Changing M/F sex classifications: In some regions
- Rights by country: Argentina; Australia; Canada; Chile; China; Colombia; France; Germany; Kenya; Malta; Mexico; Nepal; New Zealand; South Africa; Spain; Switzerland; Taiwan; Uganda; United Kingdom; United States

Citizens of Spain who are intersex face problems that the wider society does not encounter. Although laws that provide protection against discrimination or genital mutilation for intersex people used to exist only in some autonomous communities rather than on a national level, ever since 2023 a law has been passed that regulates these issues on a national level.

Inter-sexuality is not widely recognized in Spain, as it is rarely discussed even within LGBT organizations. As a result, intersex people used to face problems such as genital mutilation during childhood, discrimination, and a lack of legal capacity to change their legal gender status after an incorrect sex assignment. As of 2025, minors and adults over 14 years old can change their gender on official documents without the need of psychiatric or medical reports or without needing to be on mandatory drugs to change your sex. Also, the practice of genital modifications on minors under 12 years old is banned except in cases where is medically needed because they can prevent other health problems.

The United Nations Committee on the Rights of the Child has condemned Spain on the grounds of genital mutilation, as the committee believes that Spain failed to comply with its obligation to protect children from genital modification. Spain has changed its legislation, greatly improving the issue ever since.

== History ==
During the rule of the Roman Empire, Roman customs stated that people born with ambiguous genitals were signs of bad omen and monsters that had to be killed in a purification ceremony. During the time when the Romans ruled over Hispania those rules were no longer enforced and intersex people had the right to be married.

When the Umayyad Caliphate ruled over the Iberian Peninsula, medieval Muslims acknowledged the existence of intersex people, known as khuntha (Arabic: خنثى). When the sex of the person was not ambiguous, they were considered to be of the predominant sex, and when the sex could not be determined easily, they would be considered as a third sex. According to Sharia law, different rules applied to men and women—for example, in the case of inheritances. Sometimes an exploration of the anatomy of the khuntha was required to determine if a person had to follow the laws pertaining to women or to men.

During the Middle Ages, the Catholic Church taught that only two sexes exist: male and female. Non-ambiguous intersex people were considered to belong to the gender they were more alike and people with ambiguous genitalia had to choose a sex and abide by it. Intersex people had to comply with the current laws in regard to the chosen gender throughout their entire lives. For example, if an intersex person chose to live as a man, that person would be convicted on the grounds of sodomy if they were to have sexual relations with a man and if they chose to live as a woman, it would be illegal to have sex with a woman but would be allowed to do so with a man.

A notorious case during the 16th century related to a person called Elena de Céspedes, who lived as a man in order to practice as a surgeon. There is some debate about whether de Céspedes was intersex, transgender, or living as a man in order to work. When de Céspedes was born, they were assigned female at birth by their parents and they married a man, but later changed their name to Eleno and married a woman. During their defense at the Spanish Inquisition, de Céspedes stated that they were born with both male and female genitals, but the tribunal claimed that de Céspedes had used their medical knowledge to alter their own genitalia. They were sentenced to two hundred lashes and to work in a hospital without pay for ten years.

The first documented intersex person in Spain was Fernanda Fernández from Zújar. During the 18th century, Fernández was assigned female at birth by their parents and they served as a nun for 14 years. At age 32, Fernández underwent several medical examinations and it was declared that they were male because their genitalia was unlike that of a woman. Fernández's vows as a nun were canceled and they began to dress as a man.

During the 19th century there was a serial killer called Manuel Blanco Romasanta who is now speculated to have been intersex. When Romasanta was born, their parents were unsure about the baby's sex, so they were assigned female at birth and received the name Manuela, but when Romasanta was eight years old, they were included as a man in a civil parish register. Historians have described Romasanta as having "feminine" traits.

Intersex and LGBTQ+ peoples were persecuted during the Franco regime and intersex people were seen by the Franco administration as monsters. Florencio Pla Messenguer, nicknamed "La Pastora," was born in 1917 with ambiguous genitalia and was named Teresa and declared female by their parents, who wished to protect Messenguer from having to join the military. Messenguer was teased as a child and after a traumatic genital examination by members of the Franco military, decided to transition to a masculine presentation. Messenguer then joined the anti-Franco forces, but was eventually detained and sent to a number of female prisons. Messenguer was eventually pardoned and released in 1978 after spending twenty years in prison.

== Physical integrity and bodily autonomy ==
=== Before 2023 ===
Before 2023, Madrid, Aragon, the Balearic Islands, and Valencia were the only autonomous communities that had laws against intersex genital mutilations, represented in green.

In Spain, genital mutilation for intersex people was legal and financed by the state through the Spanish National Health System. These surgical procedures were often performed on babies or children per choice of their parents, and in these cases were non-consensual, irreversible, and medically unnecessary. Due to the operation complications, recovery, the social and emotional transition, and a multitude of other complexities, health and psychological problems frequently resulted. However, the legal availability of these surgeries also provided outstanding benefits, such as aesthetics, an opportunity to overcome the belief that intersex people will not be able to properly adjust themselves to society or maintain emotional relationships because of their atypical genitals, and they still today provide the ability to combat certain medical conditions that can result from intersexual practices, such as the increased incidence of cancer.

As of 2019, Madrid, Aragon, the Balearic Islands, and Valencia were the only autonomous communities with laws that banned intersex genital mutilation for minors. Instead, they required genital surgery of minors to be delayed until the patient reaches an age that legislators in these communities deemed appropriate for this kind of decision-making. Bills regarding genital surgery of minors had also been drafted in the Canary Islands, Asturias, and Cantabria, but none had officially been approved before 2023.

=== Since 2023 ===
Ever since 2023, genital alterations have been banned on a national level for children under the age of 12, except in those cases when performing them prevents other health complications that may arise as a consequence of the intersex characteristic. Genital alterations will be allowed in children between 12 and 16 years old only in the case they are mature enough to understand and consent to these practices.

== Right to life ==
Prenatal screening can detect certain medical conditions in the fetus, including inter-sexuality. As a result, some parents choose to abort children presenting with atypical genitals. These systematic abortions are not considered ethical, and therefore some NGOs, as well as the Committee of Ministers of the Council of Europe, have pushed for the ban of these tests. In 2015, a Council of Europe Issue Paper on Human rights and intersex people stated:

Intersex people’s right to life can be violated in discriminatory “sex selection” and “preimplantation genetic diagnosis, other forms of testing, and selection for particular characteristics”. Such de-selection or selective abortions are incompatible with ethics and human rights standards due to the discrimination perpetrated against intersex people on the basis of their sex characteristics.

== Protection from discrimination ==
Intersex people are at risk for bullying and a higher poverty rates.

== Remedies and claims for compensation ==
Spain currently does not have any kind of compensation or reparation system for victims of intersex genital mutilation. Although there have been several lawsuits, none have been won. Due to the stigma surrounding inter-sexuality it is difficult for people to access their original medical records in order to make an appeal.

== Identification documents ==
To intersex people, legal recognition is more about the right to change their legal gender and to declare self-determination of their sexual identity. Some intersex rights organizations are against the notion of a third gender classification because they consider that it is a cause of discrimination and other forms of gender-based violence. However, third gender classifications are necessary because some intersex people do not identify as a man or woman. The law in Spain does not recognize the existence of non-binary genders, and for this reason it can be difficult to change genders legally.

Frequently, an intersex person is assigned a sex when they are born, but then begin to develop traits of the opposite sex as they mature, specifically during puberty. Additionally, inappropriate sex assignments are common in Spain because the parents of intersex children only have 72 hours to register their child's sex on the Civil Registry after birth. As a result, the process of changing genders involves adjusting the legal gender stated on the DNI, the Spanish National Identity card.

=== Before 2023 ===
Autonomous communities in Spain where legal gender could be changed without having to receive surgical or hormonal treatments before 2023.

However, according to the previous Spanish law passed in 3/2007, hormone treatment was required for two years to be able to change legal gender on the DNI, and to be diagnosed with gender dysphoria. The 2007 law, which relates to registering sex changes, as well as Article 54 and Title V of the Civil Registration Act of 1957 required all names in a DNI to be clearly-gendered. According to a paper published in 2012, between 8.5% and 20% of intersex people experience dysphoria, so those outside of this percentage are somewhat restricted. However, some laws had been developed at the regional level that allow to change gender freely.

=== After 2023 ===
Ever since 2023, legal gender modification on official documents is allowed without the need of psychiatric or medical reports or without needing to be on mandatory drugs to change your sex for adults and minors who are 16 years old or older. Minors who are 14 or 15 years old can also do this as long as their parents or legal guardians agree.

For minors 12 or 13 years old, they still can change their legal gender but in this case they will be required to present documents that certify that they feel uncomfortable in their assigned sex at birth, and they can be asked to go through further tests deemed necessary.

As for minors under 12 years old, they will not be allowed to change their legal gender until they grow up.

== Rights advocacy ==
In Spain, there are several intersex rights organizations, depending on the type of condition. Some of these are AISSG Spain (GrApSIA), the Spanish Society for Congenital Adrenal Hyperplasia and AMAR.

The Mexican project Brújula Intersexual reports about news related with inter-sexuality in the Spanish language, particularly about events occurring in the Spanish-speaking world. It is focused on spreading information and awareness about the topic of inter-sexuality.

== See also ==
- LGBT rights in Spain
