= Intersex rights in New Zealand =

Overview of intersex people's rights in New Zealand

- New Zealand
- Protection of physical integrity and bodily autonomy: No
- Protection from discrimination: Not tested
- Access to identification documents: Yes
- Access to same rights as other men and women: No
- Changing M/F sex classifications: Yes
- Third gender or sex classifications: Yes
- Marriage: Yes
- Rights by country: Argentina; Australia; Canada; Chile; China; Colombia; France; Germany; Kenya; Malta; Mexico; Nepal; New Zealand; South Africa; Spain; Switzerland; Taiwan; Uganda; United Kingdom; United States

Intersex rights in New Zealand are protections and rights afforded to intersex people. Protection from discrimination is implied by the Human Rights Act and the Bill of Rights Act, but remains untested. The New Zealand Human Rights Commission states that there has seemingly been a "lack of political will to address issues involved in current practices of genital normalisation on intersex children".

In March 2017, New Zealand and Australian community organizations issued a joint call for legal reform, including the criminalization of deferrable intersex medical interventions on children, an end to legal classification of sex, and improved access to peer support.

== History ==
Early common law, like canon law, held that hermaphrodites were to be treated as male or female depending on the prevailing sex.

In the early part of the 21st-century, the Human Rights Commission studied the circumstances of intersex people within the context of studies on the human rights situation of transgender people. Later work has examined the situation of intersex people separately, including the human rights implications of intersex medical interventions, shame and secrecy.

Notable civil society institutions and individuals include the Intersex Trust Aotearoa New Zealand, Mani Mitchell and refugee Eliana Rubashkyn. Mitchell narrated the documentary Intersexion in 2012.

In March 2017, representatives of Intersex Trust Aotearoa New Zealand participated in an Australian and Aotearoa/New Zealand consensus "Darlington Statement" by intersex community organizations and others. The statement calls for legal reform, including the criminalization of deferrable intersex medical interventions on children, an end to legal classification of sex, and improved access to peer support.

== Physical integrity and bodily autonomy ==
Legal prohibition of non-consensual medical interventions Regulatory suspension or limitation of harmful practices Legal prohibition in at least one state/province Physical integrity and bodily autonomy on intersex not legislated

In 2010 and 2016, the Human Rights Commission heard testimony from intersex people and from medical professionals, including information on medical interventions within New Zealand and in Australia, under the provisions of a High Cost Treatment Pool.

The Asia Pacific Forum of National Human Rights Institutions states that New Zealand laws and policies that prohibit female genital mutilation explicitly permit "normalizing" medical interventions on intersex infants and girls. Material presented by the Australasian Paediatric Endocrine Group to the Australian Senate in 2013 showed New Zealand to be a regional outlier in surgeries in cases of congenital adrenal hyperplasia, with genital surgical interventions favoured on infant girls aged less than six months.

In a 2016 review of the country's performance under the Convention on the Rights of the Child, the government provided conflicting information on medical interventions, including information that contradicts reports made to the Human Rights Commission. In October 2016, the UN Committee on the Rights of the Child issued observations on practices in New Zealand, including recommendations to ensure "that no one is subjected to unnecessary medical or surgical treatment during infancy or childhood, guaranteeing the rights of children to bodily integrity, autonomy and self-determination".

A 2016 Intersex Roundtable by the Human Rights Commission on genital "normalizing" surgeries found that there was a lack of political will to address surgeries, concerns with service delivery to parents and families, the development of legislative safeguards, and a need to test the right to bodily autonomy against the Bill of Rights Act.

In March 2017, an Australian and Aotearoa/New Zealand community statement called for acknowledgement, an apology, and compensation for intersex people who have been subjected to "involuntary or coercive medical interventions".

In July 2018, the UN Committee on the Elimination of Discrimination against Women issued concluding observations on harmful practices, recommending that New Zealand adopt "clear legislative provisions explicitly prohibiting the performance of unnecessary surgical or other medical treatment on intersex children before they reach the legal age of consent". The Committee also called for the provision of redress, and counselling and support to families.

== Protection from discrimination ==
Explicit protection from discrimination on grounds of sex characteristics Explicit protection on grounds of intersex status Explicit protection on grounds of intersex within attribute of sex

The New Zealand Human Rights Commission noted in its 2004 report on the status of human rights in New Zealand that intersex people in New Zealand face discrimination in several aspects of their lives, however the law is unclear on the legal status of discrimination based on sex characteristics or intersex status. Currently, the Commission believes that the Human Rights Act 1993 may protect intersex persons under the laws preventing discrimination on the basis of sex, and the Bill of Rights Act 1990 may adequately recognize rights to bodily autonomy and refusal of medical treatment, but this has not been tested.

== Identification documents ==
New Zealand passports are available with 'M', 'F' and 'X' sex descriptors for applicants of indeterminate sex. Passports with an 'X' descriptor were originally introduced for people transitioning gender. Birth certificates are available at birth showing "indeterminate" sex if it is not possible to assign a sex.

In March 2017, an Australian and Aotearoa/New Zealand community statement called for an end to legal classification of sex, stating that legal third classifications, like binary classifications, were based on structural violence and failed to respect diversity and a "right to self-determination".

== Marriage ==
Any adult couple is able to marry in New Zealand. A private member's bill by Labour MP Louisa Wall which proposed defining marriage to be inclusive regardless of gender became law on 19 April 2013. The first same-sex marriages were conducted in August 2013.

== See also ==
- Intersex Trust Aotearoa New Zealand
- Intersex human rights
- LGBT rights in New Zealand
- Transgender rights in New Zealand
- Disability rights in New Zealand
- Human rights in New Zealand

== Bibliography ==
- Asia Pacific Forum of National Human Rights Institutions (June 2016). Promoting and Protecting Human Rights in relation to Sexual Orientation, Gender Identity and Sex Characteristics. ISBN 978-0-9942513-7-4. Archived from the original on 15 January 2017.
- Human Rights Commission (August 2004), Human Rights in New Zealand Today – New Zealand Action Plan for Human Rights'
- Human Rights Commission (25 January 2010). "Intersex sections from the Transgender Inquiry's final report". Archived from the original on 14 April 2017.
- Human Rights Commission (July 2010). "February 2010 Auckland Intersex Roundtable".
- Human Rights Commission (2016), Intersex Roundtable Report 2016 The practice of genital normalisation on intersex children in Aotearoa New Zealand (PDF)
