= Mokoena =

Mokoena is a South African surname. Notable people by that name include:

- Aaron Mokoena (born 1980), South African international footballer
- Fana Mokoena (born 1971), South African actor
- Godfrey Khotso Mokoena (born 1985), South African athlete
- Julian Mokoena, South African politician
- Nthabiseng Mokoena, South African intersex activist
- Teboho Mokoena (born 1974), South African former international footballer
- Teboho Mokoena (born 1997), South African international footballer
- Thapelo Mokoena, South African actor
- Thabang Mokoena, (born 2006), South African international footballer

== See also ==
- The River (South African TV series), The Mokoena family, consisting of Malefu Mokoena and her children, Thuso, Dimpho and Itumeleng, live in Refilwe.
