= Janik Bastien-Charlebois =

Canadian sociologist

Dr. Janik Bastien-Charlebois
- Occupation: Professor
- Employer: Université du Québec à Montréal
- Known for: Sociologist and intersex advocate

Janik Bastien-Charlebois is a Canadian sociologist, professor, and advocate for intersex rights. She teaches at the Université du Québec à Montréal, and her areas of study include cultural democracy, testimony, epistemology, homophobia and feminism.

== Personal life and activism ==
In an interview with the Montreal Gazette, and with Être, Bastien-Charlebois describes the medical "normalization" of her body at age 17 as a process of dispossession. Her activism began slowly following a meeting with Curtis Hinkle, the founder of Organisation Intersex International, in Montreal in 2005. She has participated in the second and third International Intersex Forums.

== Career ==
Janik Bastien-Charlebois is a professor in the Department of Sociology at the Université du Québec à Montréal, where she works in research groups on "Testimonial Cultures", homophobia, and the Institute for Research on Feminist Studies. During 2014 and 2015, Bastien-Charlebois was a visiting scholar at the Centre for Transdisciplinary Gender Studies (Zentrum für transdisziplinäre Geschlechterstudien), Humboldt University of Berlin.

Her book, La virilité en jeu (Manhood at stake), examines the inevitability of boys' homophobic behaviors through interviews with adolescent boys. Bastien-Charlebois disputes arguments focused on human nature and male identity formation, suggesting instead that heterosexuality is socially constructed.

In recent work, Bastien-Charlebois critiques the medical treatment of intersex voices.

Bastien-Charlebois speaks internationally, and has been interviewed by the Montreal Gazette, Le Nouvelliste, Le Devoir and Être.

== Selected publications ==
=== Book ===
- Bastien-Charlebois, Janik (2011). La virilité en jeu. Editions du Septentrion. ISBN 9782894486658.

=== Journal articles ===
- Bastien Charlebois, Janik (December 2017). "Les sujets intersexes peuvent-ils (se) penser ?. Les empiétements de l'injustice épistémique sur le processus de subjectivation politique des personnes intersex(ué)es". Socio. La nouvelle revue des sciences sociales (9): 143–162. doi:10.4000/socio.2945. ISSN 2266-3134.
- Bastien-Charlebois, Janik (2014). "Femmes intersexes: Sujet politique extrême du féminisme (Intersex Women, Feminism's Extreme Political Subject)". Recherches féministes. 27 (1): 237. doi:10.7202/1025425ar. ISSN 0838-4479.
- Bastien-Charlebois, Janik (2011). "Au-delà de la phobie de l'homo : quand le concept d'homophobie porte ombrage à la lutte contre l'hétérosexisme et l'hétéronormativité". Reflets: Revue d'intervention sociale et communautaire. 17 (1): 112–149. doi:10.7202/1005235ar. ISSN 1203-4576.

=== Editorials ===
- Bastien-Charlebois, Janik (October 24, 2016). "How medical discourse dehumanizes intersex people". Intersex Day.
- Bastien-Charlebois, Janik (September 2, 2016). "De la lourdeur d'écrire un article universitaire sur les enjeux intersexes lorsqu'on est soi-même intersexe". Observatoire des transidentités. Archived from the original on August 14, 2017.
- Bastien-Charlebois, Janik (October 2015). "Sanctioned sex/ualities: The medical treatment of intersex bodies and voices". International Lesbian, Gay, Bisexual, Trans and Intersex Association. Archived from the original on 2016-10-11.
- Bastien-Charlebois, Janik (August 9, 2015). "My coming out: The lingering intersex taboo". Montreal Gazette.

== See also ==
- Intersex human rights
