= Intersex rights in Switzerland =

Overview of intersex people's rights in Switzerland

- Location of Switzerland within Europe
- Protection of physical integrity and bodily autonomy: No
- Protection from discrimination: No
- Rights by country: Argentina; Australia; Canada; Chile; China; Colombia; France; Germany; Kenya; Malta; Mexico; Nepal; New Zealand; South Africa; Spain; Switzerland; Taiwan; Uganda; United Kingdom; United States

Intersex people in Switzerland have no recognition of rights to physical integrity and bodily autonomy, and no specific protections from discrimination on the basis of sex characteristics. In 2012, the Swiss National Advisory Commission on Biomedical Ethics published a report on the medical management of differences of sex development or intersex variations.

== History ==
The 12th-century canon law collection known as the Decretum Gratiani states that "Whether an hermaphrodite may witness a testament, depends on which sex prevails" ("Hermafroditus an ad testamentum adhiberi possit, qualitas sexus incalescentis ostendit.") On ordainment, Raming, Macy and Cook found that the Decretum Gratiani states, "item Hermafroditus. If therefore the person is drawn to the feminine more than the male, the person does not receive the order. If the reverse, the person is able to receive but ought not to be ordained on account of deformity and monstrosity."

== Physical integrity and bodily autonomy ==
Legal prohibition of non-consensual medical interventions Regulatory suspension of non-consensual medical interventions

Researchers have argued that intersex medical interventions on intersex children violate constitutional protections from discrimination and protection of human dignity.

In late 2012, following a request by the Director of the Federal Office of Public Health, the National Advisory Commission on Biomedical Ethics reported on the ethics of medical management of intersex, following an inquiry and multiple hearings. The Commission heard from parents, individuals with intersex traits, legal experts, and clinical practitioners. The Commission report makes a strong case against medical intervention for "psychosocial" reasons:

Especially delicate are those cases where a psychosocial indication is used to justify the medical urgency of surgical sex assignment in children who lack capacity. Here, there is a particularly great risk of insufficient respect being accorded to the child's (future) self-determination and its physical integrity...

Decisions on sex assignment interventions are to be guided by the questions of what genitalia a child actually requires at a given age (apart from a functional urinary system) and how these interventions will affect the physical and mental health of the child and the future adult. Treatment needs to be carefully justified, especially since – in functional, aesthetic and psychological respects – surgically altered genitalia ... are not comparable to natural male or female genitalia. Decisions are to be guided, above all, by the child's welfare...

The harmful consequences may include, for example, loss of fertility and sexual sensitivity, chronic pain, or pain associated with dilation (bougienage) of a surgically created vagina, with traumatizing effects for the child. If such interventions are performed solely with a view to integration of the child into its family and social environment, then they run counter to the child's welfare. In addition, there is no guarantee that the intended purpose (integration) will be achieved...

... on ethical and legal grounds, all (non-trivial) sex assignment treatment decisions which have irreversible consequences but can be deferred should not be taken until the person to be treated can decide for him/herself.

— National Advisory Commission on Biomedical Ethics

The report recommends deferring all "non-trivial" surgeries which have "irreversible consequences". The report also recommended criminal sanction for non-medically necessary genital surgeries.

In 2013, following publication of the Commission report, Blaise Meyrat, paediatric surgeon at Lausanne University Hospital told Swissinfo that "It’s a pity that, because of a lack of ethical clarity in the medical profession, we have to get legislators involved, but in my opinion it’s the only solution".

In recent years, Advocacy group Zwischengeschlecht and researchers have documented hospital practices and guidelines that permit intersex medical interventions for esthetic and psychosocial reasons, and their human rights implications. Zwischengeschlecht note that hospitals decline to publish statistics.

In 2015, the UN Committee on the Rights of the Child called on Switzerland to implement recommendations of the National Advisory Commission on Biomedical Ethics, and "ensure that no one is subjected to unnecessary medical or surgical treatment during infancy or childhood, guarantee bodily integrity, autonomy and self-determination to the children concerned, and provide families with intersex children with adequate counselling and support." Similar recommendations were made later the same year by the UN Committee Against Torture. In July 2018, the UN Committee on the Elimination of Discrimination against Women issued concluding observations on harmful practices, recommending that Switzerland "take all necessary measures to ensure that no child undergoes unnecessary surgery intended to assign sex". The Committee also called for access to medical records, and the provision of compensation .

In April 2019, the Grand Council of Geneva passed two motions, one unanimously, against the use of such surgeries, which they labelled "mutilation". The motions foresee a compensation scheme and free psychosocial counselling for the victims, as well as the dismissal of any doctor or physician who performs these procedures on intersex people without their consent.

== Remedies and claims for compensation ==
The 2012 National Advisory Commission on Biomedical Ethics report is notable for making a clear apology for damage done to intersex people in the past, and up until the present, calling for societal recognition:

The suffering experienced by some people with DSD as a result of past practice should be acknowledged by society. The medical practice of the time was guided by sociocultural values which, from today’s ethical viewpoint, are not compatible with fundamental human rights, specifically respect for physical and psychological integrity and the right to self-determination.

— National Advisory Commission on Biomedical Ethics

An April 2019 motion by the Grand Council of Geneva proposed a compensation scheme.

== Identification documents ==
In 2012, the National Advisory Commission on Biomedical Ethics called for increased flexibility in amending sex as recorded in the civil status register. In response to the report, the deputy director of Bern University Interdisciplinary Centre for Gender Studies called in 2013 for intersex people to be designated an "indeterminate sex". Advocacy group Zwischengeschlecht has described the creation of new sex classifications as "silly season fantasies".

In 2018, the National Council, the lower house of Parliament, accepted a motion to allow intersex individuals to leave their sex entry blank, with 109 votes in favour. The Federal Council will now review the motions and later express recommendations.

== Marriage ==
Same-sex marriage became legal in Switzerland on 1 July 2022 following a referendum on the matter in September of the previous year. Intersex people may marry others with the same sex classification.

== Advocacy ==
Swiss peer support and advocacy organizations include the peer support and advocacy organization InterAction Suisse, self-help group Selbsthilfegruppe Intersex, parent support group Verein SI Selbsthilfe Intersexualität, and advocacy organization Zwischengeschlecht.

In August 2016, Zwischengeschlecht described actions to promote equality or civil status legislation without action on banning "intersex genital mutilations" as a form of pinkwashing. The organization has previously highlighted evasive government statements to UN Treaty Bodies that conflate intersex, transgender and LGBT issues, instead of addressing harmful practices on infants.

== See also ==
- Intersex human rights
- Zwischengeschlecht
- LGBT rights in Switzerland
- Human rights in Switzerland

== Bibliography ==
- National Advisory Commission on Biomedical Ethics NEK-CNE (November 2012). On the management of differences of sex development. Ethical issues relating to "intersexuality".Opinion No. 20/2012 (PDF). Berne. Archived from the original (PDF) on 2015-04-23.
- Truffer, Daniela (2015). "It's a Human Rights Issue!". Narrative Inquiry in Bioethics. 5 (2): 111–114. doi:10.1353/nib.2015.0037. PMID 26300139. S2CID 28335241.
- United Nations; Committee on the Rights of Child (February 26, 2015). "Concluding observations on the combined second to fourth periodic reports of Switzerland". Geneva.
- United Nations; Committee against Torture (September 7, 2015), Concluding observations on the seventh periodic report of Switzerland, Geneva
- Zwischengeschlecht.org (March 2014). "Intersex Genital Mutilations Human Rights Violations Of Children With Variations Of Sex Anatomy: NGO Report to the 2nd, 3rd and 4th Periodic Report of Switzerland on the Convention on the Rights of the Child (CRC)" (PDF). Zurich.
- Zwischengeschlecht (March 2015). Intersex Genital Mutilations Human Rights Violations Of Children With Variations Of Sex Anatomy: NGO Report on the Answers to the List of Issues (LoI) in Relation to the Initial Periodic Report of Switzerland on the Convention on the Rights of Persons with Disabilities (CRPD) (PDF). Zurich.
