= Nthabiseng Mokoena =

Intersex activist

- Born: Coligny, North West Province
- Known for: Intersex activist

Nthabiseng Mokoena is a prominent South African intersex activist and an advisory board member for the first intersex human rights fund.

== Early life ==
Mokoena describes how she was born with both male and female sexual characteristics, and struggled with shame and identity. Her mother was supportive, despite suffering blame and stigma for her different child. For Mokoena, meeting other intersex people helped to overcome feelings of shame.

Mokoena declined free clitoris reduction surgery aimed at creating a more feminine genital appearance. In doing so, Mokoena would have been a clinical case study, but she found this to be degrading. Mokoena says:

I am so pleased I never had surgery. The people I met, most of them, black and white, who have had surgery as babies, usually have confused parents who the doctors incorrect informed, and the children were subjected to surgery which has ended up being far more traumatic and confusing.” “We have been raised in a world that makes us feel like monsters. My advice to other intersex people is to love and accept. Only then will you make the right decision about surgery. Read and research the situation, meet others like yourself and get in touch with an intersex support group. Surgery is not a magic pill that has no consequences.

== Activism ==
In 2011, Mokoena joined Transgender and Intersex Africa, initially as a board member and then later becoming Advocacy Coordinator. The organisation promotes the rights of transgender and intersex persons in rural areas and townships in South Africa. She is currently the Regional Training and Capacity Strengthening Officer for the AIDS and Rights Alliance of Southern and East Africa.

In 2015, Mokoena joined an international advisory board for a first philanthropic Intersex Human Rights Fund established by the Astraea Lesbian Foundation for Justice.

== Selected bibliography ==
- Mokoena, Nthabiseng (October 2015), "Remembering Sally, and the intersex movement in South Africa", Intersex Day

== See also ==
- Intersex rights in South Africa
