= Brújula Intersexual =

Organization that promotes the human rights of intersex individuals

Brújula Intersexual (Intersex Compass)
- Purpose: Intersex human rights, education and peer support
- Region served: Mexico and Latin America
- Founder: Laura Inter
- Website: Brújula Intersexual

Brújula Intersexual (Intersex Compass) is a voluntary organisation for intersex people that promotes the human rights and bodily autonomy of intersex people in Mexico, and across Latin America. Founded in 2013, Brújula Intersexual provides peer support, education and information.

== History ==
Brújula Intersexual was founded by Laura Inter on the day after Intersex Awareness Day in 2013, 27 October. The organization is intended to help intersex people find each other, connect, and improve their human rights situation.

== Activities ==
=== Physical integrity and bodily autonomy ===
Brújula Intersexual calls for self-determination by intersex people. It documents the health and human rights situation facing intersex people in Mexico, and in the Latin American region more broadly, including societal taboos, incomprehension, unnecessary medicalization, and discrimination. Ricardo Baruch, writing in Animal Politico and citing Laura Inter, describes the situation on where intersex is constantly left out of discussion or policy because it is not very understood, even though it is a biological situation.

In March 2017, Inter and colleagues including Natasha Jiménez of MULABI, testified before the Inter-American Commission on Human Rights on the human rights situation facing intersex people in Latin America.

The organization also engages in training for human rights and public institutions.

=== Access to healthcare ===
Brújula Intersexual has found that few doctors are trained and sensitized on intersex issues, leading to a tendency to recommend genital surgeries or hormonal treatments to create "normality" even where individuals have escaped such intersex medical interventions as children. It has documented problems with medical examinations and treatments as a result of such practices. Brújula Intersexual has also documented significant levels of poverty and disparities in access to health care based upon family wealth and income.

=== Identification documents ===
Laura Inter and Eva Alcántara of UAM Xochimilco have cited arguments that the most pressing problems facing intersex people are treatment to enforce a sex binary, and not the existence of the sex binary itself. Inter has imagined a society where sex or gender classifications are removed from birth certificates and other official identification documents.

=== International work ===
Laura Inter represented Brújula Intersexual at the Fourth International Intersex Forum, held in Amsterdam in April 2017.

== See also ==
- Intersex rights in Mexico
- Intersex human rights
- Intersex civil society organizations
