= Morgan Holmes =

Intersex activist

- Occupation: Professor of sociology
- Known for: Intersex activist, writer, educator

Morgan Holmes is a Canadian sociologist, author, and a professor at Wilfrid Laurier University, Ontario. She is also an intersex activist and writer, and former member of Intersex Society of North America. Holmes participated in the first public demonstration by intersex people, now marked by Intersex Awareness Day.

== Early life ==
Holmes underwent a clitorectomy, described as a "clitoral recession", at age 7, at The Hospital for Sick Children in Toronto. This surgery was undertaken because her clitoris "could become erect", and the surgery has affected her life ever since, including repeated pelvic exams, adolescent sexual experiences, fear of intimacy, and feelings of difference and embarrassment. Holmes describes how clinician "promises of sexual normalcy are not being met" by surgical intervention.

Holmes refers to herself as "still intersexual" after medical intervention.

== Career ==
=== Activism ===
A member of the (now defunct) Intersex Society of North America, Holmes participated with Max Beck and others in the first North American demonstration about intersex issues, a 1996 demonstration as Hermaphrodites with Attitude outside the Annual Meeting of the American Academy of Pediatrics in Boston. The event is now commemorated internationally as Intersex Awareness Day. She participated in the second International Intersex Forum in 2012.

=== Academia ===
Holmes is a professor of sociology at Wilfrid Laurier University, Ontario, where she describes her academic interests as sexuality and queer theory, feminist thought; qualitative health research and law related to sexuality and health. Holmes has also extended her interest in intersex issues to other forms of bodily diversity, including disability.

== Works ==
Holmes is widely published, including works that link intersex to queer theory and ideas of compulsory heterosexuality. In Re-membering a Queer Body' (1994), Holmes describes how surgery on intersex infants is undertaken to make bodies conform to heterosexual norms:

when a genetically male child (XY) is considered incapable of achieving "normal" heterosexual activity as a male, he will be reassigned as female even though the micropenis would be functional ... if one is born with a vagina, the appropriate sexual activity will be as receptor and not penetrator. Thus, when a body which has been designated female (either through chromosome testing or anatomical standards) possesses a phallus, the surgical procedure remains roughly the same as that for treating the micropenis: remove the phalloclit in a process of either partial or total clitorectomy.)

Holmes also problematizes this link, and in particular concepts of intersex as a third sex. In Locating Third Sexes (2004), Holmes argues that:

much of the existing work on cultural systems that incorporate a "third sex" portray simplistic visions in which societies with more than two sex/gender categories are cast as superior to those that divide the world into just two. I argue that to understand whether a system is more or less oppressive than another we have to understand how it treats its various members, not only its "thirds".

Holmes also links the medical treatment of intersex bodies to the medical treatment of disabled bodies. In Rethinking the Meaning and Management of Intersexuality (2002), she argues that the surgical normalization of intersex infants is neither enhancement nor treatment. In Distracted Attentions: Intersexuality and Human Rights Protections (2005), she discusses the conceptualization of an intersex birth as an emergency, negating requirement for informed consent. In Mind the Gaps: Intersex and (Re-productive) Spaces in Disability Studies and Bioethics (June 2008) she argues that, while clinicians presume that "intersex characteristics are inherently disabling to social viability", recognition of the personhood of the intersex child necessitates refraining from "aggressive interference". The research notes trends to selectively terminate intersex fetuses.

In her book Intersex: A Perilous Difference (2008) Holmes argues that there is a duty to understand the stakes involved in conflating what is supposedly 'natural' with what is statistically 'normal', and of what is 'normal' with what is 'healthy'." Holmes reviews medical literature and popular culture to examine how society constructs monstrosity. She "singles out" the novel Middlesex by Jeffrey Eugenides, "and episodes of The X-Files for constructing intersex characters whose lives essentially reproduce the social fascination with the monstrous and the deviant." In The Intersex Enchiridion: Naming and Knowledge in the Clinic (2011), Holmes argues that the replacement of the word "intersex" with "disorders of sex development" in clinical settings "reinstitutionalises clinical power to delineate and silence those marked by the diagnosis" and "that this silencing is precisely the point of the new terminology."

In 2009, Holmes edited Critical Intersex, a collection of essays on intersex issues, including theoretical and empirical research. The book has been described as "an important book" (Anne Fausto-Sterling), "the 'go to source' for a contemporary, international representation of intersex studies," making "contributions that are precise, plainly written and very illuminating... the detail is fascinating and somewhat unnerving... beautifully clear and compassionate" (Contemporary Sociology), and "an important collection" (Suzanne Kessler, State University of New York).

Holmes has also written on her experience as an activist, including during her membership in the Intersex Society of North America. The essay When Max Beck and Morgan Holmes went to Boston, provides an account of the participation by Holmes in the first public demonstration by intersex people, on October 26, 1996, an event that took place following the activists' exclusion from a clinical conference. The demonstration is now marked by Intersex Awareness Day

=== Selected bibliography ===
==== Books ====
- Holmes, Morgan (2008). Intersex: A Perilous Difference. Selinsgrove, Pennsylvania: Susquehanna University Press. ISBN 978-1575911175.
- Holmes, Morgan, ed. (2009). Critical Intersex. Ashgate Publishing. ISBN 9780754673118.

==== Journals and articles ====
- Holmes, Morgan (May 1994). "Re-membering a Queer Body". Undercurrents. 6: 11–130. doi:10.25071/2292-4736/37695. S2CID 142878263.
- Holmes, Morgan (May 2002). "Rethinking the Meaning and Management of Intersexuality". Sexualities. 5 (2): 159–180. doi:10.1177/1363460702005002002. ISSN 1363-4607. S2CID 144052141.
- Holmes, Morgan (July 2004). "Locating Third Sexes" (PDF). Transformations Journal. Regions of Sexuality (8). ISSN 1444-3775.
- Holmes, Morgan (2005). "Distracted Attentions: Intersexuality and Human Rights Protections". Cardozo Journal of Law & Gender. 12: 127–133.
- Holmes, Morgan (2006). "Deciding fate or protecting a developing autonomy? Intersex children and the Colombian Constitutional Court". Transgender Rights. Minneapolis, Minnesota: University of Minnesota Press. pp. 32–50.
- Holmes, Morgan (August 2007). "Cal/liope in Love: The 'Prescientific' Desires of an Apolitical 'Hermaphrodite'". Journal of Lesbian Studies. 11 (3–4): 223–232. doi:10.1300/J155v11n03_05. ISSN 1089-4160. PMID 17954458. S2CID 41405702.
- Holmes, Morgan (June 2008). "Mind the Gaps: Intersex and (Re-productive) Spaces in Disability Studies and Bioethics". Journal of Bioethical Inquiry. 5 (2–3): 169–181. CiteSeerX 10.1.1.566.1260. doi:10.1007/s11673-007-9073-2. ISSN 1176-7529. S2CID 26016185.
- Holmes, Morgan (September 2011). "The Intersex Enchiridion: Naming and Knowledge". Somatechnics. 1 (2): 388–411. doi:10.3366/soma.2011.0026. ISSN 2044-0138.
- Holmes, Morgan (October 14, 2015), When Max Beck and Morgan Holmes went to Boston, Intersex Day

== See also ==
- Intersex human rights
- Intersex medical interventions
