= Zwischengeschlecht =

Human rights organization

- Type: NGO
- Purpose: Intersex human rights
- Region served: Switzerland, French and German-speaking countries
- Website: StopIGM.org, blog.zwischengeschlecht.info (currently unavailable)

Zwischengeschlecht (literally "in-between sex") is a human rights advocacy group campaigning on intersex bodily autonomy issues. The group demonstrates outside medical events where surgical interventions are discussed or performed, engages with the media, and participates in consultations with human rights institutions.

== Advocacy ==
=== Physical integrity and bodily autonomy ===
Zwischengeschlecht were consulted by the Swiss National Advisory Commission on Biomedical Ethics in the preparation of an Opinion report, On the management of differences of sex development, Ethical issues relating to "intersexuality" in November 2012. The report is notable for making a clear apology for damage done to intersex people in the past, and up until the present. It recommends deferring all "non-trivial" surgeries which have "irreversible consequences". The report also recommended criminal sanction for non-medically necessary genital surgeries.

The organization actively campaigns for recognition of intersex medical interventions as forms of "intersex genital mutilation", including through submissions to UN institutions. In March 2017, Zwischengeschlecht reported that the UN had made 22 concluding observations on the performance of UN member states according to their international treaty obligations. This included 14 countries, across in Europe, Latin America, Asia, Africa and Oceania.

=== Protection from discrimination ===
In 2016, Zwischengeschlecht described actions to promote equality or civil status legislation without action on banning "intersex genital mutilations" as a form of pinkwashing. The organization has previously highlighted evasive government statements to UN Treaty Bodies that conflate intersex, transgender and LGBT issues, instead of addressing harmful practices on infants.

=== Identification documents ===
Zwischengeschlecht have described media coverage of moves to create a third gender classification as "silly season fantasies"; the main goal is to stop intersex genital mutilations.

=== Visibility work ===
The group demonstrates outside medical events where surgical interventions are discussed or performed, and engages with the media.

=== International activities ===
Zwischengeschlecht participated in the third International Intersex Forum in late 2013, and also contributed to a joint statement to the United Nations Human Rights Council on 11 March 2014.

== See also ==
- Intersex human rights
- Intersex rights in Switzerland
- Intersex rights in Germany
- Intersex rights by country
