= Intersex Awareness Day =

Awareness day observed annually on October 26

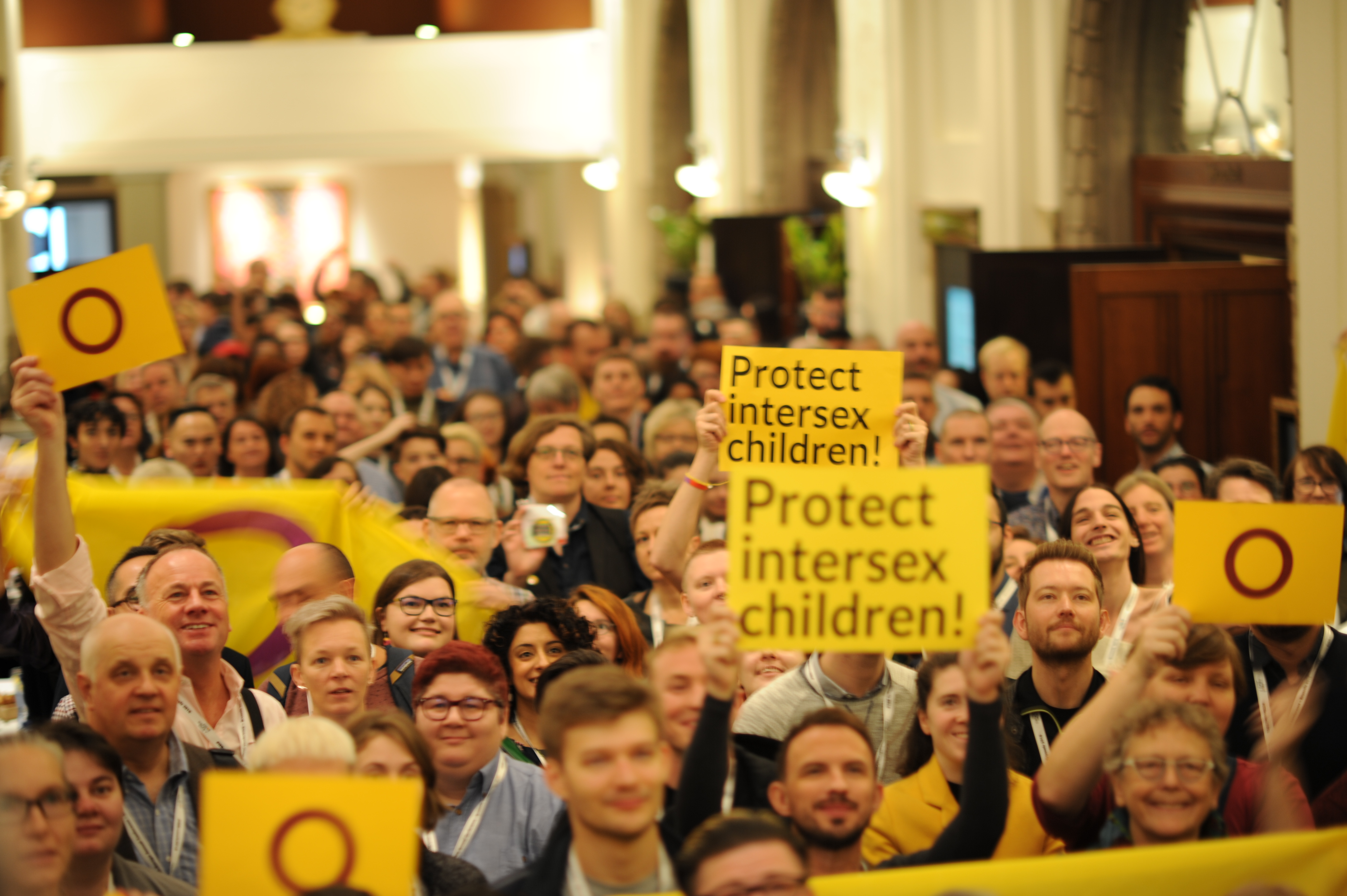
- Observed by: Intersex community, LGBT communities & allies
- Type: International
- Date: October 26
- Frequency: annual
- First time: 2003
- Related to: Intersex Day of Remembrance - November 8

Intersex Awareness Day is an internationally observed awareness day each October 26, designed to highlight human rights issues faced by intersex people.

== History ==
The event marks the first public demonstration by intersex people in North America, on October 26, 1996, outside the venue in Boston where the American Academy of Pediatrics was holding its annual conference. Intersex activists Morgan Holmes and Max Beck participated for the (now-defunct) Intersex Society of North America, alongside allies from Transsexual Menace including Riki Wilchins. Holmes has written that the event was intended not as a demonstration but as participation in the conference. She states that Beck and Holmes had intended to deliver an address, "on long-term outcomes and to challenge their still-prevailing opinion that cosmetic surgery to "fix" intersexed genitals was the best course of action", but were "met, officially, with hostility and were escorted out of the conference by security guards". The group only later demonstrated, carrying a sign saying "Hermaphrodites With Attitude".

The commemoration day itself began in 2003 with the establishment of a central awareness raising site by Betsy Driver and Emi Koyama. A central awareness raising site was later re-established in 2015 by Morgan Carpenter with Laura Inter of Brújula Intersexual, and support from Open Society Foundations.

== Observance ==
Intersex Awareness Day is an international day of grass-roots action to end shame, secrecy and unwanted genital cosmetic surgeries on intersex children. The day also provides an opportunity for reflection and political action. Between October 26 and November 8, intersex organizations bring attention to the challenges intersex individuals face, culminating in the Intersex Day of Remembrance on November 8, the birthday of Herculine Barbin, also sometimes known as Intersex Solidarity Day.

== Notable observances ==
=== 2013 ===
On Friday 25 October 2013, the day before Intersex Awareness Day that year, the Australian Senate published a report on an inquiry titled the Involuntary or coerced sterilisation of intersex people in Australia. On 11 November 2014, the New South Wales Legislative Council in Australia passed a motion marking Intersex Awareness Day and calling on the State government to "work with the Australian Government to implement the recommendations" of the 2013 Senate committee report.

=== 2014 ===
For Intersex Awareness Day 2014, the Senate of the German Land of Berlin issued a statement calling for self-determination for intersex people. Also in 2014, the Human Rights Commission of Mexico City, Distrito Federal, held a visibility event on intersex issues.

=== 2015 ===
In 2015, institutional events included the launch of an Intersex Human Rights Fund by Astraea Lesbian Foundation for Justice, and a motion submitted to New South Wales Legislative Assembly in Australia by Greens MP Jenny Leong. A lawsuit was filed by Dana Zzyym of the Intersex Campaign for Equality, with Lambda Legal, suing the United States Department of State for legal gender recognition on their passport as nonbinary and intersex. BuzzFeed reported that over 4.2 million people saw personal stories posted on social media in an action coordinated by activist Pidgeon Pagonis.

=== 2016 ===
In 2016, the United Nations Office of the High Commissioner for Human Rights launched an awareness website, while UN experts, including the Committee against Torture, the Committee on the Rights of the Child and the Committee on the Rights of Persons with Disabilities, along with the Council of Europe Commissioner for Human Rights, the Inter-American Commission on Human Rights and United Nations Special Rapporteurs called for an urgent end to human rights violations against intersex persons, including in medical settings.

Multiple governmental bodies made statements, alongside many civil society organizations. Official recognition included statements by the United States Department of State and Australian Human Rights Commission also made statements, The South African government acknowledged a need for action to prevent human rights violations, and there was a first event in Kenya.

In June 2017, the State Department statement was cited in a policy paper by Joycelyn Elders, David Satcher, and Richard Carmona, three former Surgeons General of the United States, calling for a rethink of early genital surgeries on children with intersex traits.

=== 2017 ===
Australians held an intersex awareness day event in their national parliament. The American Academy of Pediatrics issued a statement for Intersex Awareness Day, 21 years after a demonstration outside its conference that is now marked by the Day. The State Department issued a statement recognizing violence of forced medical practices.

=== 2018 ===
In 2018, OII Europe, ILGA-Europe and the European Parents' Association published a multilingual guide to parenting intersex children. US advocates wrote about proposals to define gender strictly in accordance with genitalia observed at birth. This was accompanied by news reports on children who have not undergone intersex medical interventions. Australian intersex organizations held parliamentary meetings, and awarded the 'Darling Award' to the National LGBTI Health Alliance to recognize work beyond affirmation of the Darlington Statement, a regional community declaration.

=== 2019 ===
- On October 25, the intersex flag was raised at London City Hall, Ontario, Canada for the first time ever.
- The spire of Arts Centre in Melbourne was colored in colors of intersex flag, to celebrate the day.

=== 2021 ===
- On October 26, the intersex flag was digitally displayed at Council House, Perth, Australia as part of commitment from the City of Perth following its community led LGBTQIA+ Plan.

== See also ==
- Intersex Day of Remembrance
- Intersex human rights
