= Sexual characteristics =

Characteristics that distinguish the sexes, primary and secondary

Sexual characteristics are physical traits of an organism (typically of a sexually dimorphic organism) which are indicative of or resultant from biological sexual factors. These include both primary sex characteristics, such as gonads, and secondary sex characteristics.

== Humans ==
In humans, sex organs or primary sexual characteristics, which are those a person is born with, can be distinguished from secondary sex characteristics, which develop later in life, usually during puberty. The development of both is controlled by sex hormones produced by the body after the initial fetal stage where the presence or absence of the Y-chromosome and/or the SRY gene determine development.

Male primary sex characteristics are the penis, the scrotum and the ability to ejaculate when matured. Female primary sex characteristics are the vulva, vagina, uterus, uterine tubes, cervix, and the ability to give birth and menstruate when matured.

Hormones that express sexual differentiation in humans include:

- estrogens such as estradiol
- progestogens such as progesterone
- androgens such as testosterone

The following table lists the typical sexual characteristics in humans (even though some of these can also appear in other animals as well):

Level of definition	Female	Male
Primary sexual characteristics
Gonads	Ovaries	Testicles
Levels of sex hormones	High estrogen and gestagens (including progesterone), with variation across the menstrual cycle; lower androgens (including testosterone)	High androgens (including testosterone)
Anatomy of internal genitalia	Uterine tubes, uterus, cervix, vagina, clitoral crura	Vas deferens, seminal vesicles, prostate, corpora cavernosa
Anatomy of external genitalia	Vulva (which includes the vaginal opening, glans clitoridis, clitoral hood, inner minora and outer labia)	Scrotum, penis, foreskin
Secondary sexual characteristics
	Larger breasts, wider hips, higher vocal pitch frequency, more body fat, less facial hair, less body hair, shorter height, less muscle mass, less lung capacity, smaller heart	More facial hair, more body hair, taller height, more muscle mass, development of "triangular" body form, smaller breasts, narrower hips, lower drop in vocal pitch frequency, less body fat, more lung capacity, larger heart
Both sexes	Axilliary (underarm) hair, pubic hair	

== Other organisms ==
In invertebrates and plants, hermaphrodites (which have both male and female reproductive organs either at the same time or during their life cycle) are common, and in many cases, the norm.

In other varieties of multicellular life (e.g. the fungi division, Basidiomycota), sexual characteristics can be much more complex, and may involve many more than two sexes. For details on the sexual characteristics of fungi, see: Hypha and Plasmogamy.

Secondary sex characteristics in non-human animals include manes of male lions, long tail feathers of male peafowl, the tusks of male narwhals, enlarged proboscises in male elephant seals and proboscis monkeys, the bright facial and rump coloration of male mandrills, and horns in many goats and antelopes.

== See also ==
- Mammalian gestation
- Reproduction
- Sex and gender distinction
- Sexual differentiation
