= Intersex rights in Taiwan =

- Taiwan
- Protection of physical integrity and bodily autonomy: Limited
- Protection from discrimination: Limited
- Access to identification documents: Yes
- Access to same rights as other men and women: No
- Changing M/F sex classifications: Yes
- Third gender or sex classifications: Pending
- Marriage: Yes
- Rights by country: Argentina; Australia; Canada; Chile; China; Colombia; France; Germany; Kenya; Malta; Mexico; Nepal; New Zealand; South Africa; Spain; Switzerland; Taiwan; Uganda; United Kingdom; United States

Intersex people in Taiwan currently face some gaps in legal protection of their rights to physical integrity and bodily autonomy, and in protection from discrimination on the basis of sex characteristics, with significant improvements in recent years.

== History ==
In Taiwan, intersex people are called yīnyángrĕn (lit. yin-and-yang person; hermaphrodite), shuāngxìnrĕn (lit. double-sex person), or jiānxìnrĕn (lit. middle-sex person) in Mandarin, or puànn-iam-iûnn-á (lit. half-yin-half-yang person) in Taiwanese Hokkien. A chapter of Organization Intersex International, Oii-Chinese, was founded by Hiker Chiu in 2008 as the first and sole advocacy and support group for intersex people in Taiwan and the Chinese-speaking world. The group prefers the term yīnyángrĕn over the other Mandarin terms. In June 2018, the Control Yuan, which functions partly as a national ombudsman, published a report on the government's inadequate protections of the rights of intersex people, in which the term shuāngxìnrĕn was adopted. The report demanded government agencies to address such issues pertaining to intersex rights as premature sex assignment surgery, binary gender options at birth registration and on identification documents, the lack of statistical data on intersex people and the absence of intersex-friendly policies for sports athletes. According to the report, intersex rights are broadly protected by the equality clause of the R.O.C. Constitution and enshrined by the constitutional interpretation in 2017 that found prohibition of same-sex marriage registration unconstitutional. The current Gender Equity Education Act stipulates that non-conformative gender characteristics and gender identity must be respected. Other than this, no anti-discriminatory laws specific to intersex rights are in place.

== Physical integrity and bodily autonomy ==
Legal prohibition of non-consensual medical interventions Regulatory suspension of non-consensual medical interventions

In October 2018, as a response to Control Yuan's report on intersex rights, the Ministry of Health and Welfare issued the “Recommended common principles regarding corrective surgery on non-adult intersex persons”. The guideline prohibits “non-essential and irreversible” intersex medical interventions considered to be "sex assignment surgery" on anyone under the age of 12, except in grave medical conditions. For adolescents aged between 12 and 18, "sex assignment surgery" is permitted for those "suffering difficulty in adapting to their condition", requiring approval by a medical team consisting of psychiatrist, pediatrician, pediatric surgeon and child psychologist. Assessment by a medical team as such is also needed before an intersex adult undergoes sex assignment surgery. While Hiker Chiu, the spokesperson for Oii-Chinese, conceded that the guideline was not on the statute book, she expressed optimism that medical practitioners would abide by this official guideline.

== Gender registration and identification documents ==
If the gender of a newborn is marked as uncertain on the birth certificate, the household registration office will request further proof or a chromosome test to assign one of the binary genders for the child. This could lead to problems of gender identity as the child grows up.

As of June 2019, anyone who wishes to register a sex change (binary gender), intersex people included, need to present proof that genitalia of the "prior sex" have been surgically removed. Attempts to liberalize sex change registration have stalled since 2015.

The government announced, in 2018, that “gender-friendly” measures would be incorporated in the new chip-embedded citizen identity card, scheduled to be released in late 2020. First, gender will not be explicitly displayed on the physical card. Also, as the second digit of national identification number represents gender, currently binary (“1” for male; “2” for female), in the future a third gender option (represented by digit “7”) will be available to intersex and transgender persons alike. The Ministry of Foreign Affairs pledged that the sex info on passport would be in line with gender registration as reflected on the identity card. Details of the third-gender option policy are yet to be released.

== Advocacy ==
The known advocacy and support group for intersex people in Taiwan is Oii-Chinese (established in 2008; in Chinese: 國際陰陽人組織).

== See also ==
- Intersex human rights
- Intersex rights in China
- Xie Jianshun
- LGBT rights in Taiwan
