= Legal recognition of intersex people =

Intersex people are born with sex characteristics, such as chromosomes, gonads, or genitals that, according to the United Nations Office of the High Commissioner for Human Rights, "do not fit typical binary notions of male or female bodies".

According to the Asia Pacific Forum of National Human Rights Institutions, few countries have provided for the legal recognition of intersex people. The Asia Pacific Forum states that the legal recognition of intersex people is firstly about access to the same rights as other men and women, when assigned male or female; secondly it is about access to administrative corrections to legal documents when an original sex assignment is not appropriate; and thirdly it is not about the creation of a third sex or gender classification for intersex people as a population but it is, instead, about self determination.

The Asia Pacific Forum, the Council of Europe, and the Malta declaration of the Third International Intersex Forum have called for non-binary gender classifications to be available on a voluntary, opt-in basis. The Council of Europe has called for greater consideration of the implications of new sex classifications on intersex people, while the Third International Intersex Forum called for the long term removal of sex or gender from official identification documents.

In some countries, legal recognition may be limited, access to any form of birth certificate may be difficult, while some other countries recognise that intersex people may have non-binary gender identities. Sociological research in Australia, a country with a non-binary gender marker, has shown that 19% of people born with atypical sex characteristics may prefer that option.

== History ==
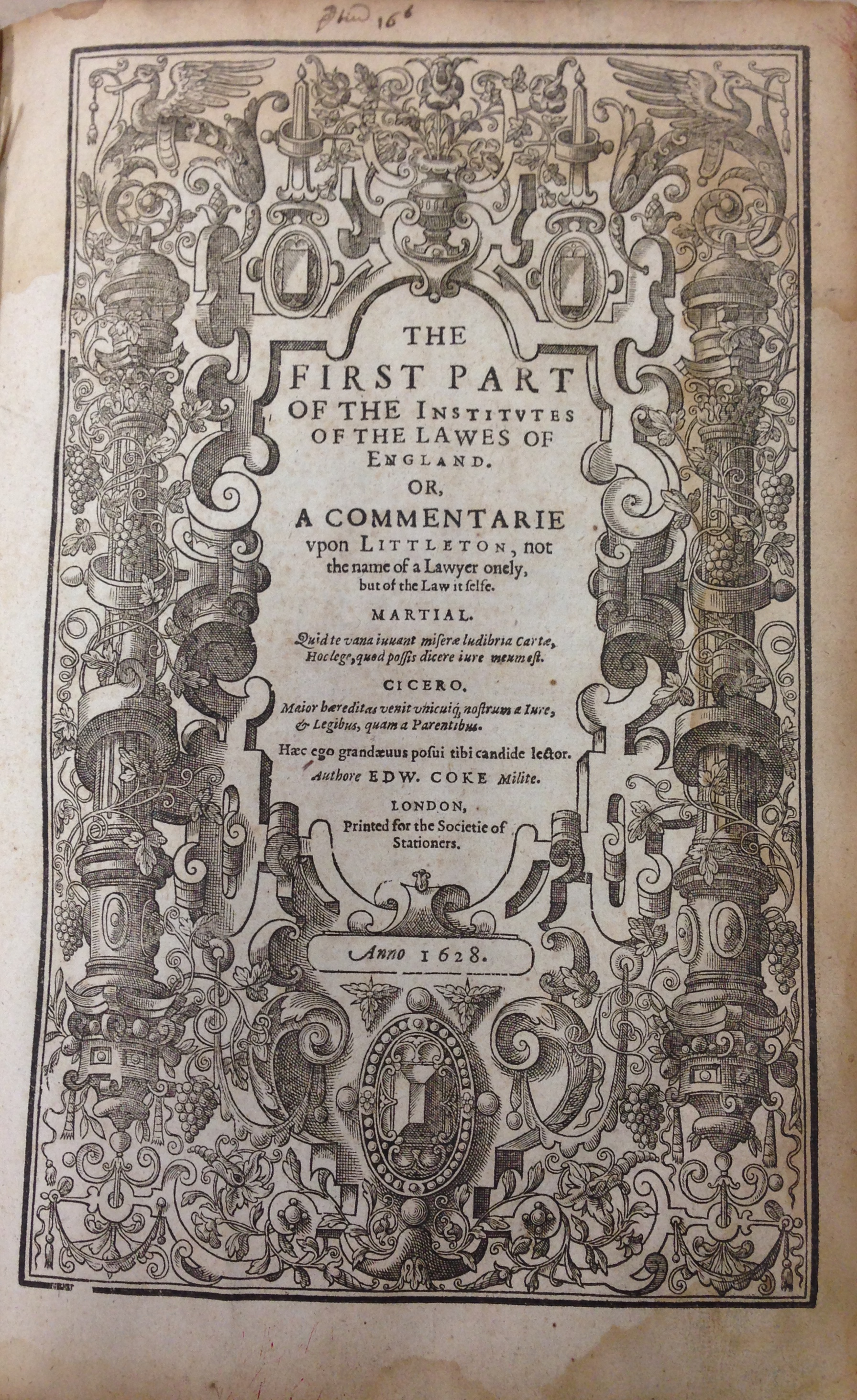
Edward Coke, The First Part of the Institutes of the Lawes of England (1st ed, 1628, title page) - 20131124

In European societies, Roman law, post-classical Canon law, and later Common law, referred to a person's sex as male, female or hermaphrodite, with legal rights as male or female depending on the characteristics that appeared most dominant. Under Roman law, a hermaphrodite had to be classed as either male or female. The 12th-century Decretum Gratiani states that "Whether an hermaphrodite may witness a testament, depends on which sex prevails". The foundation of common law, the 16th Century Institutes of the Lawes of England described how a hermaphrodite could inherit "either as male or female, according to that kind of sexe which doth prevaile." Single cases have been described in Canon law and other legal cases over the centuries.

Intersex scholar Morgan Holmes states that much early anthropological material on non-European cultures described gender systems with more than two categories as "primitive", but also that subsequent analysis of third sexes and genders is simplistic or romanticized:

much of the existing work on cultural systems that incorporate a 'third sex' portray simplistic visions in which societies with more than two sex/gender categories are cast as superior to those that divide the world into just two. I argue that to understand whether a system is more or less oppressive than another we have to understand how it treats its various members, not only its 'thirds'... recognition of third sexes and third genders is not equal to valuing the presence of those who were neither male nor female, and often hinges on the explicit devaluation of women

In recent years, civil society organization and human rights institutions have raised issues relating to legal recognition.

== Intersex rights ==
Research indicates a growing consensus that diverse intersex bodies are normal—if relatively rare—forms of human biology, and human rights institutions are placing increasing scrutiny on medical practices and issues of discrimination against intersex people. A 2013 first international pilot study. Human Rights between the Sexes, by Dan Christian Ghattas, found that intersex people are discriminated against worldwide: "Intersex individuals are considered individuals with a «disorder» in all areas in which Western medicine prevails. They are more or less obviously treated as sick or «abnormal», depending on the respective society."

In 2015, an Issue Paper on Human rights and intersex people by the Council of Europe highlighted several areas of concern, including legal recognition:

- Equal right to life and prevention of medical treatments without informed consent including treatments considered unnecessary;
- Removal of Intersex as a curable medical condition but one which can have medical treatments with informed consent;
- Equal treatment under the law; including specific legal provisions similar to other classes covered;
- Access to information, medical records, peer and other counselling and support;
- Self-determination in gender recognition, through expeditious access to official documents.

== Legal recognition ==
2026 Equaldex map, showing some regions with intersex registers

According to the Asia Pacific Forum of National Human Rights Institutions, few countries have provided for the legal recognition of intersex people. The Asia Pacific Forum states that the legal recognition of intersex people is firstly about access to the same rights as other men and women, when assigned male or female; secondly it is about access to administrative corrections to legal documents when an original sex assignment is not appropriate; and thirdly, while opt in schemes may help some individuals, legal recognition is not about the creation of a third sex or gender classification for intersex people as a population.

On January 20, 2025, US president Donald Trump signed Executive Order 14168, entitled "Defending Women from Gender Ideology Extremism and Restoring Biological Truth to the Federal Government". This executive order asserts that it is the policy of the United States that there are only two sexes, male and female, and that these sexes are immutable throughout a person's life, starting at conception. According to intersex advocate Alicia Roth Weigel, this order "attempts to negate our very existence".

=== Gender identities ===
Like all individuals, some intersex individuals may be raised as a particular sex (male or female) but then identify with another later in life, while most do not. A 2012 clinical review suggests that between 8.5 and 20% of persons with intersex conditions may experience gender dysphoria, distress or discomfort as a result of the sex and gender they were assigned at birth.

Like non-intersex people, some intersex individuals may not identify themselves as either exclusively female or exclusively male. Sociological research in Australia, a country with a third 'X' sex classification, shows that 19% of people born with atypical sex characteristics selected an "X" or "other" option, while 52% are women, 23% men, and 6% unsure. At birth, 52% of persons in the study were assigned female, and 41% were assigned male.

Research has also shown gender identities of intersex individuals to be independent of sexual orientation.

Intersex advocate Morgan Carpenter states that intersex should not be reduced to a gender identity issue; "intersex as identity is polymorphic, but asserts the dignity of stigmatised embodiment." Dan Christian Ghattas states that "People who do not have an intersex body and want to use ‘intersex’ to describe their gender identity, should be aware of the fact that, unfortunately, they are actually making intersex human rights violations less visible."

=== Access to identification documents ===
Currently, depending on the jurisdiction, access to any birth certificate may be an issue, including a birth certificate with a sex marker, and in the absence of surgical requirements.

In 2014 a Kenyan court ordered its government to issue a birth certificate to a five-year-old child born with ambiguous genitalia, necessary to allow the child to attend school and obtain a national identity document. Many intersex persons in Uganda are understood to be stateless due to historical difficulties in obtaining identification documents, despite a birth registration law that permits intersex minors to change assignment.

A 2017 submission by Justicia Intersex and Zwischengeschlecht to the United Nations Committee Against Torture identified two Argentinian cases of children denied birth certificates without parental consent to irreversible medical interventions.

=== Access to the same rights as other men and women ===
The Asia Pacific Forum of National Human Rights Institutions states that:

Recognition before the law means having legal personhood and the legal protections that flow from that. For intersex people, this is neither primarily nor solely about amending birth registrations or other official documents. Firstly, it is about intersex people who have been issued a male or a female birth certificate being able to enjoy the same legal rights as other men and women

Accessing the same rights as other men and women supposes the elimination of stigma and discrimination on grounds of sex characteristics, and rights to physical integrity and freedom from torture and ill-treatment.

The Asia Pacific Forum also highlights access to sport and concerns with sex verification policies. Sex testing began at the 1966 European Athletics Championships in response to suspicion that several of the best women athletes from the Soviet Union and Eastern Europe were actually men. At the Olympics, testing was introduced in 1968. Initially, sex verification took the form of physical examinations. It subsequently evolved into chromosome testing, and later testosterone testing. Reports have shown how elite women athletes with intersex conditions have been humiliated, excluded, and suffered human rights violations as a result of sex verification testing. Such cases have included female genital mutilation and sterilization.

=== Changing identification documents ===
Countries recognising gender self-identification; sub-national entities are only marked for some countries as of November 2024

Access to a birth certificate with a correct sex marker may be an issue for intersex people who do not identify with their sex assigned at birth.

Some countries have the gender self-determination legal model such as Argentina, Belgium, Malta, Denmark, Greece, France, Portugal, Norway, Chile, Uruguay, Luxembourg, Colombia, Ecuador, Iceland, and Ireland permit changes to sex classifications via simple administrative methods. Some countries, such as Vietnam, Thailand, Japan, some jurisdictions in both Australia and the United States and many European countries only permit changes to sex classifications following sexual reassignment surgery. Other countries do not permit intersex people to change sex assignment at all or, such as the United Kingdom, only by declaring that they are transgender and obtaining a diagnosis of gender dysphoria.

=== Third sex or gender classifications ===
Nonbinary / third gender available as voluntary opt-in Opt-in for intersex people only Standard for third gender Standard for intersex Nonbinary / third gender not legally recognized / no data

The passports and identification documents of Australia, New Zealand and some other nationalities have adopted "X" as a valid third category besides "M" (male) and "F" (female), at least since 2003. US states have recognised third options since at least 2012, in the case of an 'hermaphrodite' birth certificate sex marker in Ohio. In 2013, Germany became the first European nation to register babies with characteristics of both sexes as indeterminate gender on birth certificates, amidst opposition and skepticism from intersex organisations who point out that the law mandates exclusion from male or female categories.

US organization Intersex Campaign for Equality successfully pursued third sex/gender classification through a federal court case filed on Intersex Awareness Day, October 26, 2015. On November 22, 2016, the United States District Court for the District of Colorado ruled in favor of intersex Navy veteran Dana Zzyym, associate director of Intersex Campaign for Equality, stating that the State Department violated federal law in denying Zzyym a passport because they did not select M/male or F/female as their sex marker. On October 27, 2021, the very first US X Passport was issued to Dana Zzyym. As stated by Lambda Legal, Zzyym's legal representatives in the lawsuit, the X is a "sex/gender" marker representing both intersex and non-binary/gender nonconforming people. The X passport was issued to Zzyym because their medical records demonstrated to the courts that they are not male or female but intersex; in keeping with federal precedent regarding M/F markers, and statewide precedent regarding the X markers, the passport X represents both sex and gender identity. It does not require medical documentation, and will be available to any citizen who wishes to opt out of binary sex/gender classifications. On September 26, 2016, intersex California resident Sara Kelly Keenan became the second person in the United States to legally change her gender to non-binary. In December 2016, Keenan received a birth certificate with an 'Intersex' sex marker from New York City. Press coverage also disclosed that Ohio issued a birth certificate with a sex marker of 'hermaphrodite' in 2012.

The intersex movement supports voluntary and opt-in non-binary and multiple sex classifications, described in the statement of the Third International Intersex Forum. The Open Society Foundations published a report, License to Be Yourself in May 2014, documenting "some of the world's most progressive and rights-based laws and policies" enabling changes to gender markers on official documents. The report comments on the recognition of third classifications, stating:

From a rights-based perspective, third sex / gender options should be voluntary... Those identifying as a third sex / gender should have the same rights as those identifying as male or female.

The Council of Europe acknowledged concerns about recognition of third and blank classifications in a 2015 Issue Paper, stating that these may lead to "forced outings" and "lead to an increase in pressure on parents of intersex children to decide in favour of one sex." The Issue Paper argues that "further reflection on non-binary legal identification is necessary":

Mauro Cabral, Global Action for Trans Equality (GATE) Co-Director, indicated that any recognition outside the "F"/"M" dichotomy needs to be adequately planned and executed with a human rights point of view, noting that: "People tend to identify a third sex with freedom from the gender binary, but that is not necessarily the case. If only trans and/or intersex people can access that third category, or if they are compulsively assigned a third sex, then the gender binary gets stronger, not weaker"

The Asia Pacific Forum of National Human Rights Institutions recognised the right of individuals to non-binary or third sex classifications, but stated that, "creating a third, separate category for the registration of people born with an intersex trait ... would risk segregating and potentially stigmatising intersex people. It would also remove their right to determine their own sex or gender."

In March 2017, an Australian and New Zealand community statement called for an end to legal classification of sex, stating that legal third classifications, like binary classifications, were based on structural violence and failed to respect diversity and a "right to self-determination".

=== Ending official classification by sex or gender ===
The statement of the Third International Intersex Forum calls for an end to official classification by sex or gender on identification documents. Dan Christian Ghattas of OII Europe states that, "providing the options for all parents to leave the sex/ gender entry open for their child would promote the equality of all sexes and genders". Laura Inter of Mexican intersex organization Brújula Intersexual, imagines a society where sex or gender classifications are removed from birth certificates and other official identification documents, and Morgan Carpenter of OII Australia states that, "the removal of sex and gender, like race and religion, from official documentation" is "a more universal, long-term policy goal".

In March 2017, an Australian and New Zealand community statement called for an end to legal classification of sex, stating that legal third classifications, like binary classifications, were based on structural violence and failed to respect diversity and a "right to self-determination". It also called for the criminalization of deferrable intersex medical interventions.

=== Sex and gender distinctions ===
Distinctions between sex and gender are lost in many official or legal documents, and also online. In 2014, Facebook introduced dozens of options for users to specify their gender, including the option of intersex.

=== Malta declaration ===
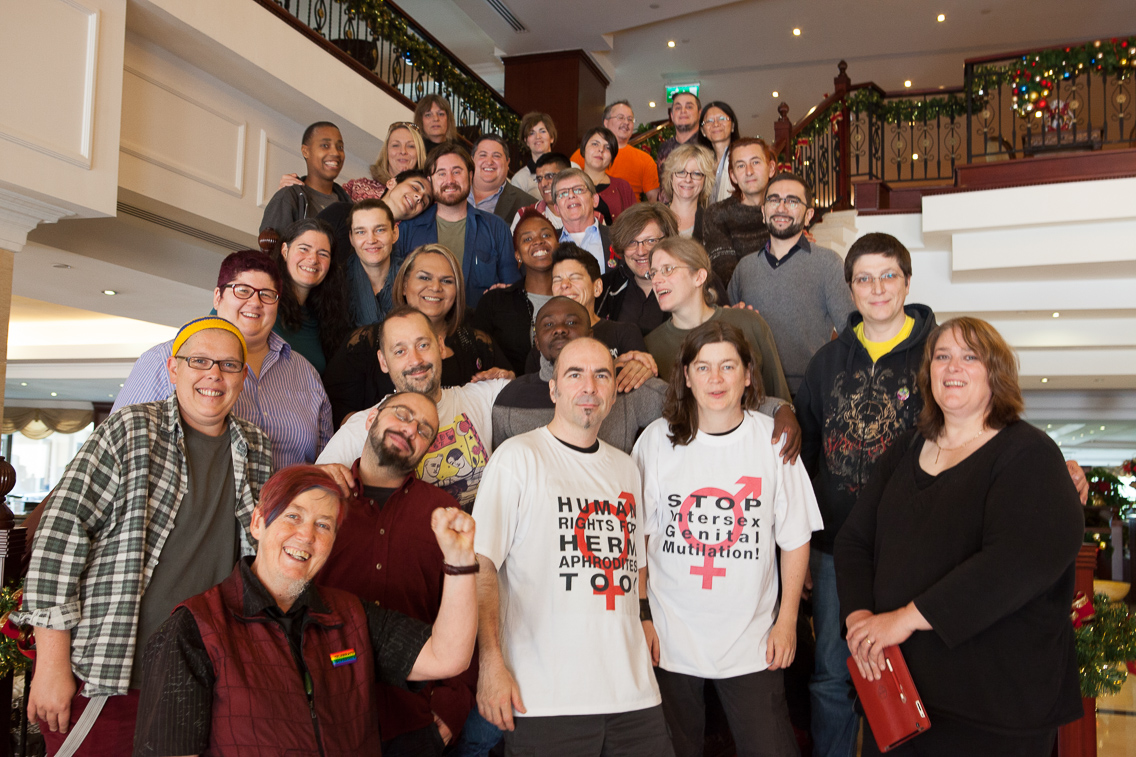
Participants at the third International Intersex Forum, Malta, in December 2013

The Malta declaration by the Third International Intersex Forum, in 2013, called for infants and children to be assigned male or female, on the understanding that later identification may differ:

- To register intersex children as females or males, with the awareness that, like all people, they may grow up to identify with a different sex or gender.
- To ensure that sex or gender classifications are amendable through a simple administrative procedure at the request of the individuals concerned. All adults and capable minors should be able to choose between female (F), male (M), non-binary or multiple options. In the future, as with race or religion, sex or gender should not be a category on birth certificates or identification documents for anybody. (Third International Intersex Forum)

== Recognition and rights by continent and jurisdiction ==
=== Africa ===
Country/jurisdiction	Physical integrity and bodily autonomy	Anti-discrimination protection	Access to identification documents	Access to same rights as other men and women	Changing M/F identification documents	Third gender or sex classifications	Ending official classification by sex or gender	Sex and gender distinctions	Assign infants and children to male or female
Kenya	Since 2022 Yes	No	Yes			Since 2022 Yes			
South Africa	No	Yes	Yes	Yes	Yes Subject to medical and social reports				
Uganda	No	No			Yes				
Nigeria	No	No	No		No				

=== Americas ===
Country/jurisdiction	Physical integrity and bodily autonomy	Anti-discrimination protection	Access to identification documents	Access to same rights as other men and women	Changing M/F identification documents	Third gender or sex classifications	Ending official classification by sex or gender	Sex and gender distinctions	Assign infants and children to male or female
Argentina	No	No			Yes Self-determination	Yes Since July 2021, gender X became available and implemented			
Canada	No	No	Yes		Yes Self-determination	Yes Also available for Canadian passport holders with male, female and X options.			
Chile	Yes	Yes	Yes		Yes Self-determination	Yes			
Colombia	No No, but restricted in children aged over 5.	No			Yes Self-determination				
Mexico	No	No				Yes Since May 2023, a gender X option formally became available on Passports within Mexico - alongside male and female options.			
United States	No	Partial, in healthcare		No Laws on female genital mutilation not enforced		Yes / No Opt in only for Washington D.C., California, New York City, Ohio (with a court order only), New Mexico, Nevada, Oregon, Utah (with a court order only), Washington State, New Jersey, Colorado, and Michigan. US Passports since January 2025 had no longer issued the gender X option, keeping previously-issued gender X passports still valid; however, in June 2025, per court order, "X"-gender passports started being issued again. Firearms transfer ATF forms and documents also have male, female and non-binary options since 2021.			
Uruguay	Yes				Yes Self-determination	Yes			

=== Asia ===
Country/jurisdiction	Physical integrity and bodily autonomy	Anti-discrimination protection	Access to identification documents	Access to same rights as other men and women	Changing M/F identification documents	Third gender or sex classifications	Ending official classification by sex or gender	Sex and gender distinctions	Assign infants and children to male or female
Bangladesh	No	No				Yes			
China	No	No							
India	No	No			Yes	Yes			
Japan	No	No			Requires surgery				
Nepal	No	No			Yes	Yes			
Pakistan	No	Yes			Yes Self-determination	Yes			
South Korea	No	No			Yes				
Thailand	No	No			Requires surgery				
Vietnam	No	No			Requires surgery				

=== Europe ===
Country/jurisdiction	Physical integrity and bodily autonomy	Anti-discrimination protection	Access to identification documents	Access to same rights as other men and women	Changing M/F identification documents	Third gender or sex classifications	Ending official classification by sex or gender	Sex and gender distinctions	Assign infants and children to male or female
Albania	Yes	Yes							
Austria						Yes			
Bosnia and Herzegovina	No	Yes							
Belgium					Yes Self-determination				
Denmark	No	No			Yes Self-determination	No			
Finland	No	Yes			Yes Self-determination	No			
France	No	No				No			
Germany	Yes with exceptions	No			Yes Self-determination	Yes			
Greece	No	Yes			Yes Self-determination				
Iceland	No	Yes			Yes Self-determination	Yes			
(Republic of Ireland) Ireland	No	No			Yes Self-determination	No			
Jersey	No	Yes							
Luxembourg					Yes				
Malta	Yes Legislated	Yes	Yes	Yes	Yes Self-determination	Yes			
Montenegro	No	Yes	No	No	No	No	No	No	No
Netherlands		Yes							
Norway		No			Yes Self-determination				
Portugal	No Legislated	Yes	Yes	Yes	Yes Self-determination	Yes			
Serbia	No	Yes							
Sweden		Yes			Yes Self-determination effective from July 1, 2025 - under enacted April 2024 legislation passed in Sweden				
Switzerland	No	No			Yes Self-determination	No			
United Kingdom	No	No			No Requires diagnosis of gender dysphoria	No			

=== Oceania ===
Country/jurisdiction	Physical integrity and bodily autonomy	Anti-discrimination protection	Access to identification documents	Access to same rights as other men and women	Changing M/F identification documents	Third gender or sex classifications	Ending official classification by sex or gender	Sex and gender distinctions	Assign infants and children to male or female
Australia	No	Yes At federal level		No Exemptions regarding sport and female genital mutilation	Yes Policies vary depending on jurisdiction Requires sexual reassignment surgery since 1996 within NSW - until June 30, 2025. "Appropriate clinical treatment" required in NT, SA and WA. Self-determination in ACT, VIC, TAS, QLD (and NSW effective from July 1, 2025).	Yes (Passports) Yes Opt in at federal level, state/territory policies vary			
New Zealand	No	No (Under sex, however indirectly implied under the Human Rights Act 1993)		No Exemptions regarding female genital mutilation	Yes Self-determination	Yes (Passports) (Third birth certificate may be used if determined at birth)			

== See also ==
- Intersex human rights
- Discrimination against intersex people
- Legal recognition of non-binary gender
