= Human rights in Australia =

Human rights in Australia were largely developed by the democratically elected Australian Parliament through legislation in specific contexts and have been safeguarded by institutions such as the independent judiciary and the High Court, which implement common law, the Australian Constitution, and various other laws of Australia and its states and territories. Australia does not have a stand-alone, abstract bill of rights. It has an independent statutory human rights body, the Australian Human Rights Commission, which investigates and conciliates complaints, and promotes human rights through education, discussion and reporting.

De jure, several human rights are protected by the Australian Constitution and the constitutions of the states and territories, in addition to a number of federal laws which exist to protect people from discrimination and human rights breaches. Universal voting rights and rights to freedom of association, freedom of, and from, religion and freedom from discrimination are protected in Australia. The Australian colonies were among the first political entities in the world to grant universal manhood suffrage (1850s) and female suffrage (1890s). As a founding member of the United Nations, Australia assisted in the drafting of the Universal Declaration of Human Rights and it is a signatory to various other international human rights treaties. However, Australia is the only democratic country in the world without its own national charter or bill of rights.

Ever since the gradual dismantling of the White Australia policy throughout the late 20th century, contemporary Australia became a liberal democracy and heir to a large post-World War II multicultural immigration program. Most forms of racial discrimination have been prohibited since 1975. Racism in Australia stems from both historical and current racist attitudes, as well as political non-compliance with some United Nations human rights treaties. Some ongoing human rights breaches in Australia stem from the legacy of mistreatment of Indigenous Australians, who remain disproportionately of disadvantaged socioeconomic standing, have shorter lifespans, and are imprisoned at a higher rate than the general population.

Australia's decision to use offshore immigration detention facilities remains contentious among many United Nations member states and human rights groups. In 2017, the United Nations High Commissioner for Refugees (UNHCR) has cited these facilities as a "damning indictment of a policy meant to avoid Australia's international human rights obligations".

== Sources of rights ==
Most human rights are not constitutionally protected at the federal level. However, certain rights are protected via statute both federally and in the states and territories (often called charters of rights), such as in Queensland, Victoria, and the Australian Capital Territory. As such, other sources of rights exist to protect rights in Australia (the Constitution, through statutes, common law, and through implementation of international treaties).

=== Australian Constitution ===
Human rights are protected under the Australian Constitution in several ways:

- Self-determination is protected by the creation of a system of responsible government chosen by the people in the form of the Australian Parliament;
- Section 41 provides a right to vote;
- Section 51(xxiii) prohibits civil conscription in relation to medical and dental services;
- section 51(xxxi) empowers the Commonwealth to acquire property only "on just terms";
- Section 80 provides a right to a jury trial for indictable offences;
- Section 92 protects freedom of interstate trade, commerce and communication among the States;
- Section 116 prohibits the Commonwealth from passing laws establishing religion, imposing religious observance, or requiring a religious test for qualification for public office;
- Section 117 prohibits discrimination on the basis of State residence.

In addition, as a result of certain structural implications and principles, the Constitution protects human rights indirectly through several means, including:

- An implied freedom of political communication on government and political matters;
- A requirement that punishment (and, with some exceptions, imprisonment) only occur pursuant a court order, arising from the separation of powers;
- A requirement that courts be independent and impartial from the executive and legislature;
- The right to challenge the legality of government action for jurisdictional error, even where legislation purports to preclude judicial review.

=== Statutes ===
Human rights are protected through various statutory enactments in a broad variety of specific contexts. For example, there are statutes which prescribe and regulate police powers, use of personal information, secret recording of conversations, equal treatment when buying goods and services, consumer rights, and many other statutes.

=== Common law ===
The common law of Australia protects rights indirectly through various causes of action (such as in contract, tort, and property rights). The common law also protects human rights through principles of statutory interpretation. One example is found in Gleeson CJ's statement that it is presumed that it is not Parliament's intention to remove a fundamental human right(s) or freedom(s) unless such an intention is outlined and manifested by clear language. This is known as the principle of legality which acts as an extra layer of protection for human rights against vague or ambiguous legislation. Furthermore, Former Chief Justice of New South Wales, James Spigelman, has compiled a list of a number of rights-depriving acts which the common law presumes the legislature does not intend without clear wording, including retrospectively changing rights and obligations, infringing personal liberty, interfering with freedom of movement or speech, restricting access to the courts, interfering with vested property rights, and denying procedural fairness.

In addition, there are various common law principles which afford certain protections, such as legal professional privilege, and the privilege against self-incrimination.

=== International Human Rights Laws in Australia ===
Australia has signed various international treaties and conventions regarding human rights. Australia has agreed to be bound by the following treaties:

- Universal Declaration on Human Rights
- International Covenant on Civil and Political Rights
- International Covenant on Economic, Social and Cultural Rights
- Convention on the Prevention and Punishment of the Crime of Genocide
- Convention on the Political Rights of Women
- International Convention on the Elimination of all forms of Racial Discrimination
- Convention on the Elimination of all forms of Discrimination against Women
- Convention against Torture and Other Cruel, Inhuman and Degrading Treatment or Punishment
- Convention on the Rights of the Child
- Convention on the Reduction of Statelessness
- Convention relating to the Status of Stateless Persons
- Convention Relating to the Status of Refugees
- 1926 Slavery Convention
- Supplementary Convention on the Abolition of Slavery
- Convention on the Rights of Persons with Disabilities

Although Australia is a signatory to these, the rights given in the treaties are only applicable in Australia if domestic legislation is established. For example, the Racial Discrimination Act 1975 (Cth), implements the Convention on the Elimination of All Forms of Racial Discrimination, and the Sex Discrimination Act 1984 (Cth), provides some of the rights outlined in the Convention on the Elimination of All Forms of Discrimination Against Women.

However, another way the rights provided in a treaty can be seen in Australian law is where provisions of a treaty are already a part of domestic legislation (for example, the Convention of the Rights of People of Disabilities can be seen as incorporated into domestic law through similar provisions in the Disability Discrimination Act 1992 (Cth)).

== Australian Human Rights Commission ==
The Australian Human Rights Commission (AHRC) (previously known as the Human Rights and Equal Opportunity Commission) is a national independent statutory body of the Australian government. Established under the Australian Human Rights Commission Act 1986 (Cth), it has responsibility for the investigation of alleged infringements under Australia's anti-discrimination legislation.

Matters that can be investigated by the Commission include discrimination on the grounds of age, race, colour or ethnic origin, racial vilification, sex, sexual harassment, sexual orientation, gender identity, intersex status, marital or relationship status, actual or potential pregnancy, breastfeeding or disability.

However, the protection of human rights has several significant limitations. For instance, human rights will often trump other public goods as it enjoys a prima facie; human rights may be violated in some circumstances or reasons like national emergency or security; human rights are protected in various States (ACT and Victoria) through legislation. However, it cannot be implemented nor enforceable at the Federal level.

== Civil and political rights ==
=== Freedom of expression ===
Under the Australian Constitution, there is an implied freedom of political communication on government and political matters.

Some restrictions on political expression exist in Australia, including laws on defamation, racial vilification, and contempt of Parliament.

In 2015, Tasmania's Anti Discrimination Commissioner found that the Catholic Church and the Archbishop of Hobart had a "case to answer" under Tasmanian Anti-Discrimination legislation for promoting the Catholic view of marriage. Australian Greens candidate Martine Delaney brought the matter to the commission. The ABC reported that case has "raised concerns about freedom of speech ahead of a national debate on same-sex marriage."

In 2007, Parliamentarian Lee Rhiannon of the Australian Greens referred remarks made by an Australian Catholic Cardinal opposing embryonic stem cell research to the New South Wales parliamentary privileges committee for allegedly being in "contempt of parliament". The Cardinal was cleared of the charge and described the move as a "clumsy attempt to curb religious freedom and freedom of speech".

In 2022, Reporters Without Borders raised concerns over eroding press freedom in Australia, citing the 'ultra-concentration of media ownership' and 'growing official pressure.'

=== Voting rights ===
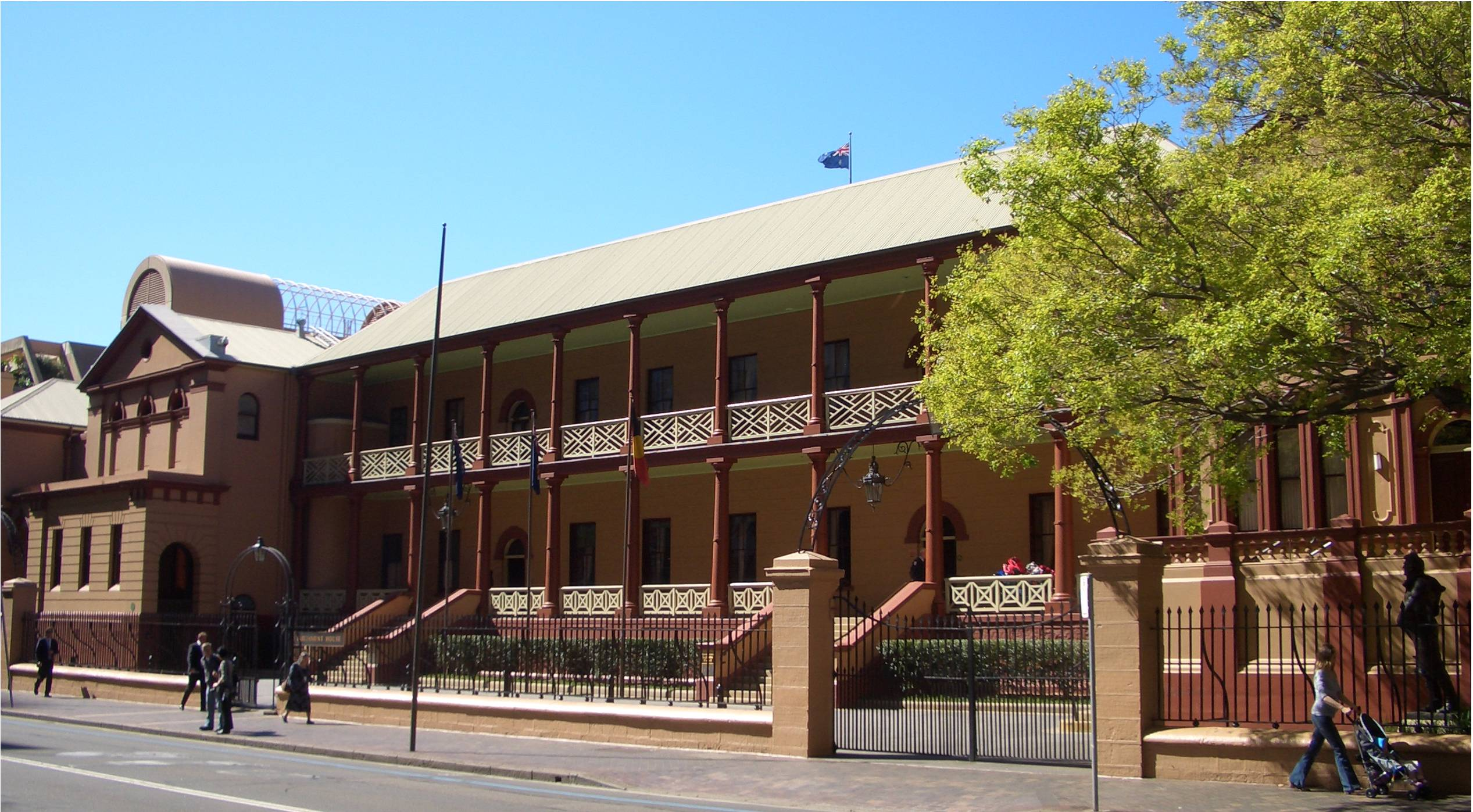
The New South Wales Parliament is Australia's oldest parliament. First elections were held in 1843.

Australians achieved voting rights decades before most other Western nations. The Australian colonies granted universal manhood suffrage from the 1850s and in 1895 the women of South Australia achieved the right to both vote and stand for Parliament, enabling Catherine Helen Spence to be the first to stand as a political candidate in 1897. After federation of the colonies in 1901, the Franchise Act 1902 was passed, granting the right to vote to men and women. However, the Act also restricted votes for 'natives' unless they were already enrolled. These restrictions were unevenly applied and were relaxed after World War II, with full rights restored by the Commonwealth Electoral Act 1962.

In 1856, an innovative secret ballot was introduced in Victoria, Tasmania and South Australia, in which the government supplied voting paper containing the names of candidates and voters could select in private. This system was adopted around the world, becoming known as the "Australian Ballot". The use of proportional representation via Single Transferable Vote (STV) and majoritarian Instant Runoff Voting (IRV) in many state/territory upper and lower houses as well as the federal Senate and House of Representatives respectively. These democratic features are upheld by rankings in V-Dem Democracy indices, Democracy Index (The Economist) and Polity IV as well as processes, proceedings and conduct being regulated by federal and state Electoral Commissions.

In South Australia, Premier Don Dunstan progressively introduced the Age of Majority (Reduction) Bill in October 1970, the voting age in South Australia was lowered to 18 years old in 1973.

=== Women's rights ===
As mentioned above Women's suffrage was granted in 1902 and property rights in 1897. The first woman elected to any Australian Parliament was Edith Cowan, to the West Australian Legislative Assembly in 1921. Dame Enid Lyons, in the Australian House of Representatives and Senator Dorothy Tangney became the first women in the Federal Parliament in 1943. In 1971, Senator Neville Bonner became the first Aboriginal Australian to sit in the federal Parliament. Rosemary Follett was elected Chief Minister of the Australian Capital Territory in 1989, becoming the first woman elected to lead a state or territory. In 2010, Julia Gillard became the first female Prime Minister of Australia.

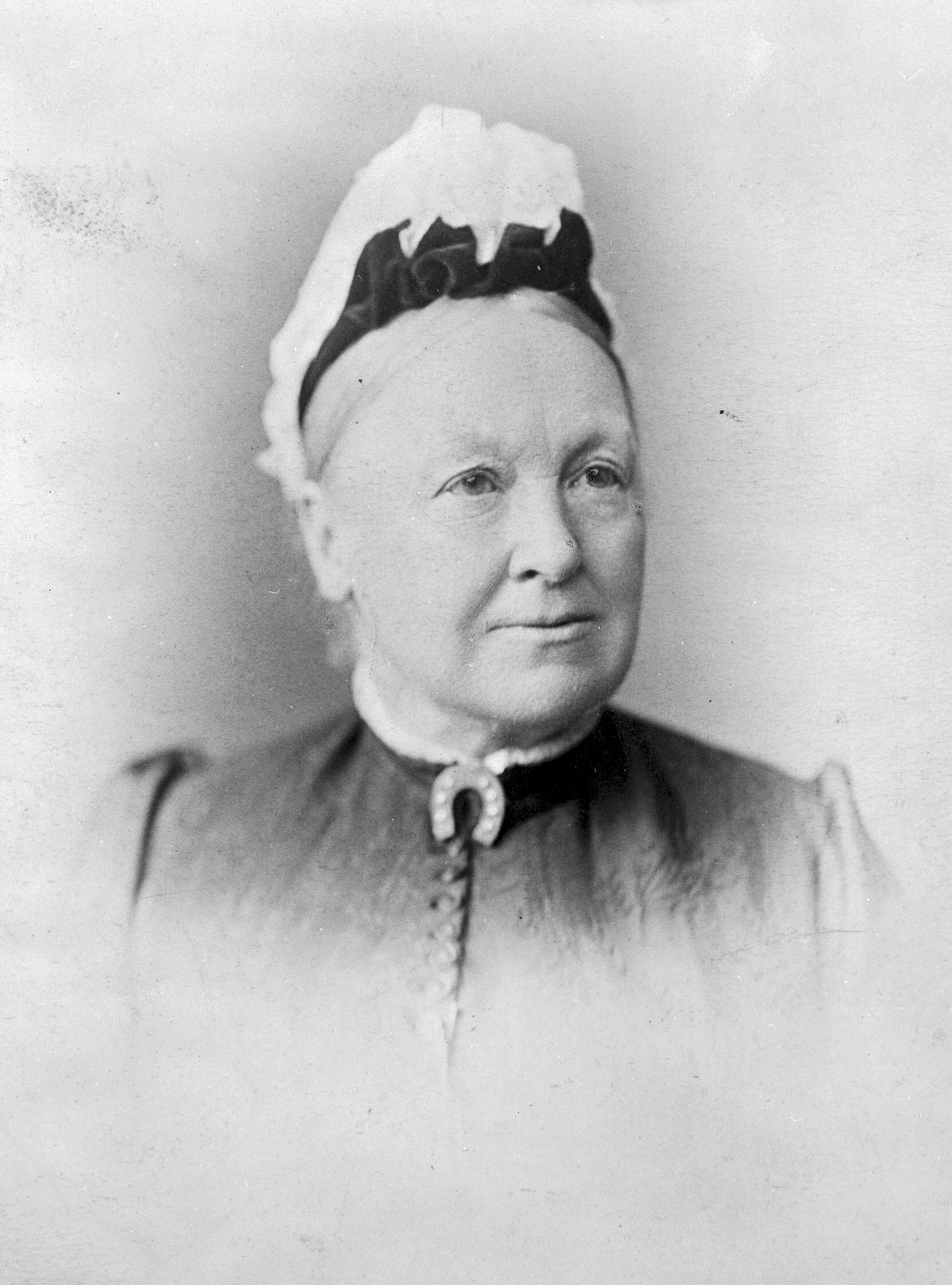
South Australian suffragette Catherine Helen Spence (1825–1910).

By 2010, the people of Australia's oldest city, Sydney, had female leaders occupying every major political office above them, with Clover Moore as Lord Mayor, Kristina Keneally as Premier of New South Wales, Marie Bashir as Governor of New South Wales, Julia Gillard as Prime Minister, Quentin Bryce as Governor General of Australia and Elizabeth II as Queen of Australia.

Australia has laws banning gender, sex, sexual orientation, marital status, breastfeeding and pregnancy discrimination, providing for equal access to services (such as parental leave, education and child care), advancing reproductive rights (through universal healthcare and laws surrounding reproductive rights), outlawing of sexual harassment, marital rape, female genital mutilation, child marriage and legalisation of no-fault divorce.

The first Australian state to deal with marital rape was South Australia, under the progressive initiatives of Premier Don Dunstan, which in 1976 partially removed the exemption. Section 73 of the Criminal Law Consolidation Act Amendment Act 1976 (SA) read: "No person shall, by reason only of the fact that he is married to some other person, be presumed to have consented to sexual intercourse with that other person".

The role of women in the Australian military began to change in the 1970s. In 1975, which was the International Year of Women, the service chiefs established a committee to explore opportunities for increased female participation in the military. This led to reforms which allowed women to deploy on active service in support roles, pregnancy no longer being grounds for automatic termination of employment and changes to leave provisions.

Despite being integrated into the military, there were still restrictions on female service. The ADF was granted an exemption from the Sexual Discrimination Act when it was introduced in 1984 so that it could maintain gender-based restrictions against women serving in combat or combat-related positions, which limited women to 40 percent of positions in the ADF. As a result of personnel shortages in the late 1980s the restriction against women in combat-related positions was dropped in 1990, and women were for the first time allowed to serve in warships, RAAF combat squadrons and many positions in the Army. Women were banned from positions involving physical combat, however, and were unable to serve in infantry, armoured, artillery and engineering units in the Army and clearance diving and ground defence positions in the RAN and RAAF respectively.

On 27 September 2011, Defence Minister Stephen Smith announced that women will be allowed to serve in frontline combat roles by 2016. Women became able to apply for all positions other than special forces roles in the Army on 1 January 2013; it is planned that this remaining restriction will be removed in 2014 once the physical standards required for service in these units are determined. Women will be directly recruited into all frontline combat positions from late 2016.

=== Capital punishment ===
The last use of the death penalty in Australia was in Victoria in 1967. Ronald Joseph Ryan was hanged at Pentridge Prison on 3 February 1967 for the murder of a prison guard, George Hodson. However, Australian criminologist, Gordon Hawkins, director of Sydney University's Institute of Criminology, doubts that Ryan was guilty.

Capital punishment was officially abolished for federal offences by the Death Penalty Abolition Act 1973. The various states abolished capital punishment at various times, starting with Queensland in 1922 and ending with New South Wales in 1985.

In South Australia, under the premiership of then-Premier Don Dunstan, the Criminal Law Consolidation Act 1935 (SA) was modified so that the death sentence was changed to life imprisonment in 1976.

=== People with a disability ===
Discrimination against persons with disabilities in various contexts is prohibited under the Disability Discrimination Act 1992 (Cth) (DDA). The Act makes it unlawful to treat a disabled person less favorably, or to fail to make reasonable adjustments for the person, in the contexts of employment, education, publicly available premises, provision of goods and services, accommodation, clubs and associations, and other contexts. Complaints made under the DDA are made to the Australian Human Rights Commission.

The Australian Government requested the Productivity Commission to evaluate the effectiveness of the DDA, and the Commission published its findings in 2004. The Commission found that while there is still room for improvement, particularly in reducing discrimination in employment, overall the DDA has been reasonably effective. The Commission found that people with a disability were less likely to finish school, to have a TAFE or university qualification and to be employed. They are more likely to have a below average income, be on a pension, live in public housing and in prison. The average personal income for people with a disability is 44 per cent of the income of other Australians.

The National Disability Insurance Scheme, is a healthcare program initiated by the Australian government. The bill was introduced into parliament in November 2012. In July 2013 the first stage of National Disability Insurance Scheme (which was at the time called DisabilityCare Australia) commenced in South Australia, Tasmania, the Hunter Region in New South Wales and the Barwon area of Victoria, while the Australian Capital Territory commenced in July 2014.

On 15 September 2020, the Human Rights Watch released a report examining the serious risk of self-harm and death for prisoners with mental health conditions. Media reports between 2010 and 2020 found that about 60 per cent of adults, who died in prisons in Western Australia, had disabilities, including mental health conditions. Of the 60 per cent, 58 per cent died due to lack of support, suicide, or after becoming a target of violence, where half of these deaths were of Aboriginal and Torres Strait Islander prisoners.

=== Child detention ===
The age for criminal responsibility in Australia is currently 10 years, well below the international standard of 14 years, leading the United Nations to call upon the Australian government to raise its age threshold.

The state of Queensland routinely detains young minors in youth detention centers, and in September 2023, the government of Queensland suspended its Human Rights Act for the second time in the year in order to detain children as young as 10 due in police holding cells due to a lack of space in its youth detention centers. The issue of child detention in Queensland disproportionately affects indigenous children, who make up nearly 63% of those in detention, despite being only 4.6% of the state's population.

The lack of an upper house in Queensland's parliament has allowed the ruling party to pass laws suspending the state's human rights legislation without adequate scrutiny. The suspension in September coincided with federal campaigning for an Indigenous rights referendum, leading to accusations of hypocrisy.

== Treatment of particular groups and minorities ==
=== Indigenous Australians ===
The wellbeing of Indigenous Australians is an ongoing issue in Australia.

There is significant disparity in health between Indigenous and non-Indigenous Australians. In 2010–2012, the estimated life expectancy at birth for Aboriginal and Torres Strait Islander males was 69.1 years, and for females 73.7 years. This was 10.6 years lower than the life expectancy of non-Indigenous males, and 9.5 years lower than that of non-Indigenous females. A 2006 study by the Australian Institute of Health and Welfare showed that 70% of the Aboriginal population die before the age of 65, compared with 20% of non-Indigenous Australians. Additionally, the suicide rate among Aboriginal Australians is almost three times higher (at 4.2%) than the national average (1.5%).

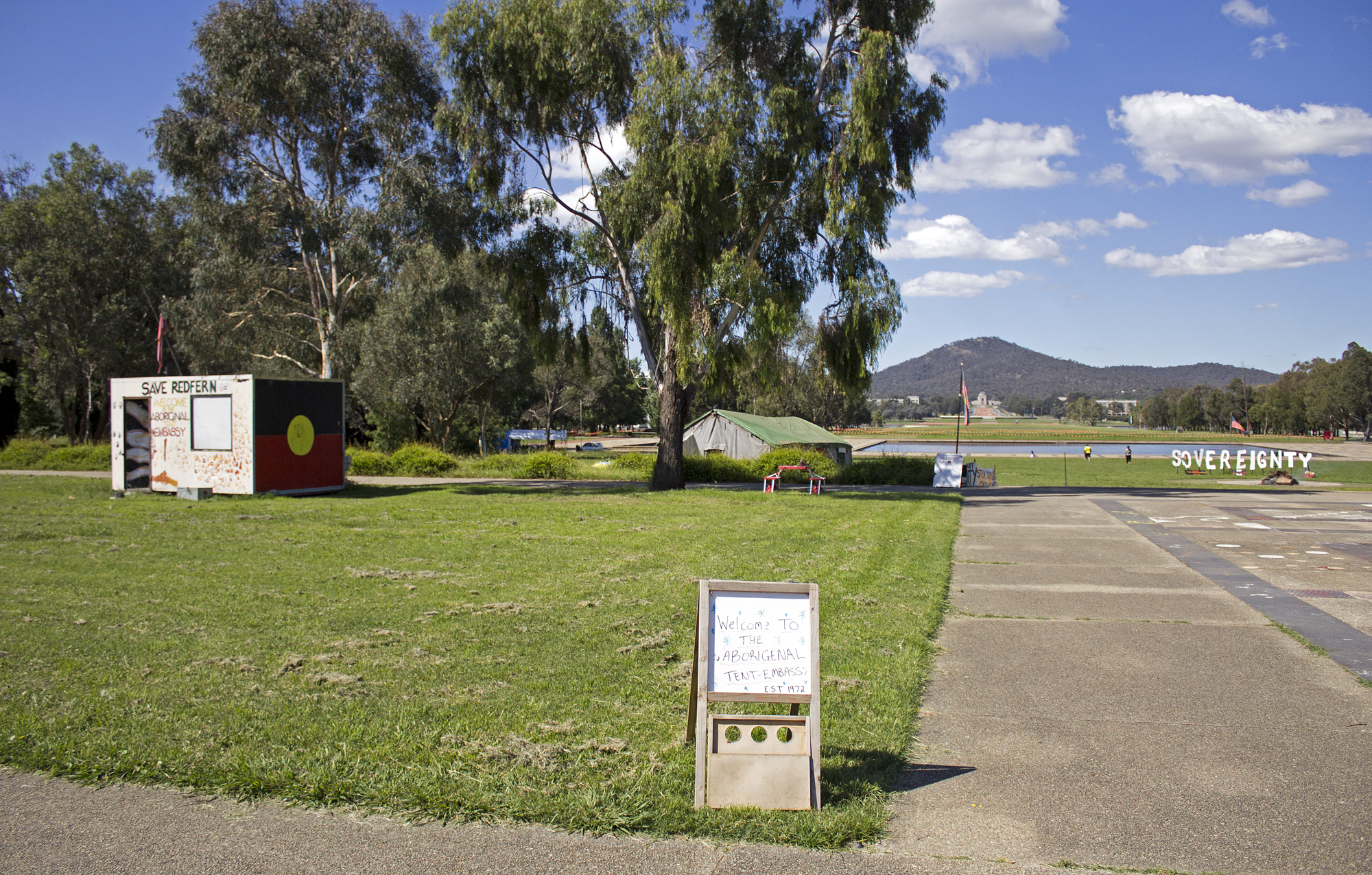
The Aboriginal Tent Embassy set up in Canberra by activist agitating for the rights of Indigenous Australians.

The roots of the present condition can be traced to the historical treatment of Aboriginal people and the dispossession of land that occurred following European colonisation of Australia, where a combination of disease, loss of land (and thus food resources) and violence decimated the Aboriginal population. Later, from the 1830s, colonial governments established the now controversial offices of the Protector of Aborigines in an effort to avoid mistreatment of Indigenous peoples and conduct government policy towards them. Christian churches in Australia sought to convert Aboriginal people, and were often used by government to carry out welfare and assimilation policies.

The Caledon Bay crisis of 1932–4 saw one of the last incidents of frontier violence, which began when the spearing of Japanese poachers who had been molesting Yolngu women was followed by the killing of a policeman. As the crisis unfolded, national opinion swung behind the Aboriginal people involved, and the first appeal on behalf of an Indigenous Australian to the High Court of Australia was launched. Elsewhere around this time, activists like Sir Douglas Nicholls were commencing their campaigns for Aboriginal rights within the established Australian political system and the age of frontier conflict closed.

In 1962, the Menzies government's Commonwealth Electoral Act provided that all Indigenous Australians should have the right to enrol and vote at federal elections (prior to this, Indigenous people in Queensland, Western Australia and some in the Northern Territory had been excluded from voting unless they were ex-servicemen). The successor Holt government called the 1967 Referendum which removed the discriminatory clause in the Australian Constitution which excluded Aboriginal Australians from being counted in the census – the referendum was one of the few to be overwhelmingly endorsed by the Australian electorate (over 90% voted "yes").

From the 1960s, Australian writers began to re-assess European assumptions about Aboriginal Australia – with works including Geoffrey Blainey's landmark history Triumph of the Nomads (1975) and the books of historian Henry Reynolds.

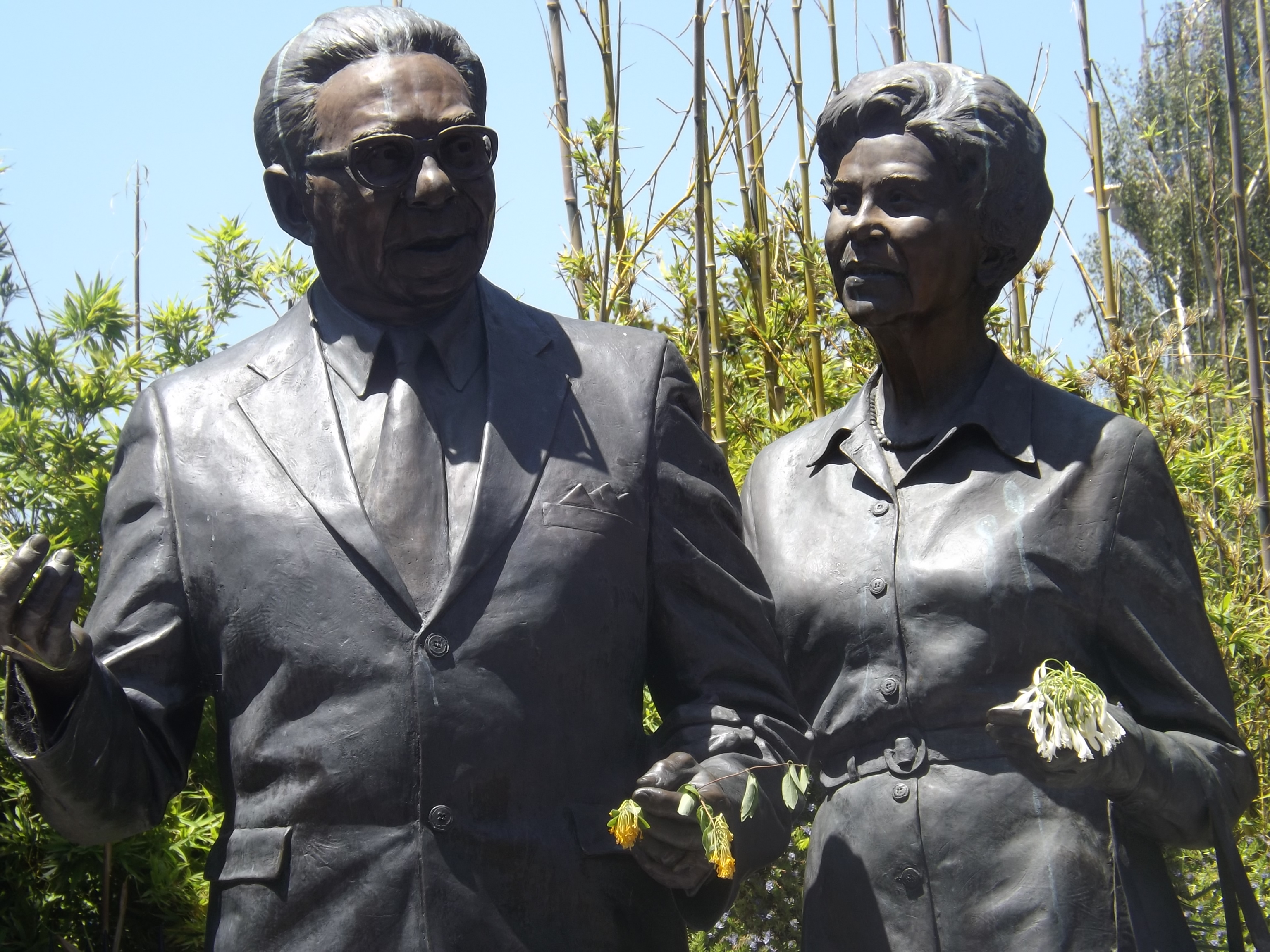
Statue of Aboriginal rights campaigner Sir Doug Nicholls, Parliament Gardens, Fitzroy, Victoria

From the late 1960s a movement for Aboriginal land rights developed, especially in South Australia under the Premiership of Don Dunstan. This era saw vast reformation in regards to land rights, anti-discrimination and personal rights.

In the mid-1960s, one of the earliest Aboriginal graduates from the University of Sydney, Charles Perkins, helped organise freedom rides into parts of Australia to expose discrimination and inequality. In 1966, the Gurindji people of Wave Hill station (owned by the Vestey Group) commenced strike action led by Vincent Lingiari in a quest for equal pay and recognition of land rights.

The Whitlam Labor and Fraser Liberal governments instigated the Aboriginal Land Rights Act 1976, which, while limited to the Northern Territory, affirmed "inalienable" native title to some traditional lands. In 1985, the Hawke government returned ownership of Uluru (formerly known as Ayers Rock) to the local Pitjantjatjara Aboriginal people.

Indigenous Australians began to take up representation in Australian parliaments during the 1970s. In 1971 Neville Bonner of the Liberal Party was appointed by the Queensland Parliament to replace a retiring senator, becoming the first Aboriginal in Federal Parliament. Bonner was returned as a Senator at the 1972 election and remained until 1983. Hyacinth Tungutalum of the Country Liberal Party in the Northern Territory and Eric Deeral of the National Party of Queensland, became the first Indigenous people elected to territory and state legislatures in 1974. In 1976, under the recommendation of Premier Don Dunstan, Sir Douglas Nicholls was appointed Governor of South Australia, becoming the first Aboriginal to hold vice-regal office in Australia. Aden Ridgeway of the Australian Democrats served as a senator during the 1990s, but no Indigenous person was elected to the House of Representatives, until West Australian Liberal Ken Wyatt, in August 2010.

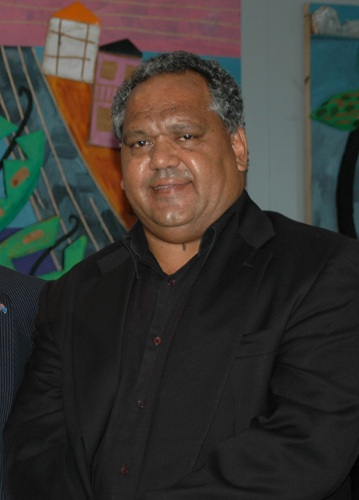
Lawyer and rights activist, Noel Pearson of Cape York.

In 1992, the High Court of Australia handed down its decision in the Mabo Case, recognising native title. That same year, Prime Minister Paul Keating said in his Redfern Park Speech that European settlers were responsible for the difficulties Australian Aboriginal communities continued to face. In 1999 Parliament passed a Motion of Reconciliation drafted by Prime Minister John Howard and Aboriginal Senator Aden Ridgeway naming mistreatment of Indigenous Australians as the most "blemished chapter in our national history".

Prior to the calling of a 2007 federal election, the then Prime Minister, John Howard, revisited the idea of bringing a referendum to seek recognition of Indigenous Australians in the Constitution (his government first sought to include recognition of Aboriginal peoples in the Preamble to the Constitution in a 1999 referendum). The Labor opposition initially supported the idea; however, Kevin Rudd withdrew this support just prior to the election.

In 2007, Prime Minister John Howard and Indigenous Affairs Minister Mal Brough launched the Northern Territory National Emergency Response. In response to the Little Children are Sacred Report into allegations of child abuse among Indigenous communities in the Territory, the government banned alcohol in prescribed communities in the Northern Territory; quarantined a percentage of welfare payments for essential goods purchasing; despatched additional police and medical personnel to the region; and suspended the permit system for access to Indigenous communities. The policy was largely maintained under the Rudd and Gillard governments.

Notable contemporary Indigenous rights campaigners have included: federal politicians Ridgeway and Wyatt, lawyer Noel Pearson; academic Marcia Langton; and Australians of the Year Lowitja O'Donoghue (1984), Mandawuy Yunupingu (1992), Cathy Freeman (1998) and Mick Dodson (2009). As of 2016, there were five Indigenous people serving in the Federal Parliament of Australia.

In 2016–17, the estimated direct expenditure per person was $44,886 for Aboriginal and Torres Strait Islander Australians, which was around twice the rate for non-Indigenous Australians ($22,356).

An annual report called "Closing the Gap" is presented to the parliament by the office of Prime Minister and Cabinet and it details the gap in multiple facets of life disproportionately affecting Aboriginal and Torres Strait Islander people compared to non-Indigenous including education, life expectancy, infant mortality, employment, housing and criminal justice. Despite a decade of action though, the life expectancy gap continues to widen with only marginal if any improvements in other sectors of Indigenous affairs and according to Oxfam "they are still denied the same access to these services that non-Indigenous people take for granted".

On 30 October 2019, Ken Wyatt, Minister for Indigenous Australians in the Morrison government, announced the commencement of a "co-design process" aimed at providing an Indigenous voice to government. The Senior Advisory Group (SAG) is co-chaired by Professor Tom Calma AO, Chancellor of the University of Canberra, and Professor Dr Marcia Langton, Associate Provost at the University of Melbourne, and comprises a total of 20 leaders and experts from across the country. There was some skepticism about the process from the beginning, with the criticism that it did not honour the Uluru Statement from the Heart's plea to "walk with us in a movement of the Australian people for a better future". According to Michelle Grattan, "...it is notable that it is calling it a 'voice to government' rather than a 'voice to parliament' ". Prime Minister Scott Morrison rejected the proposal in the Uluru Statement for a voice to parliament to be put into the Australian constitution; instead, the voice will be enshrined in legislation. The government also said it would run a referendum during its present term about recognising Indigenous people in the constitution "should a consensus be reached and should it be likely to succeed”.

Jurisdiction	Land rights	De jure equal treatment	De facto equal treatment	Right to self determination	Reparations	Treaty
Australia	Yes	Yes	No	No	No	No (currently underway in a number of states)

=== Immigrants and asylum seekers ===
Australia is an immigrant nation with a large and longstanding multi-ethnic migration program.

Historically, from the 1890s to the 1950s the country adhered to the White Australia Policy, which effectively barred or impeded people of non-European descent from immigrating to Australia. The policy was dismantled by successive governments after World War II, and from the 1970s successive governments officially supported multiculturalism.

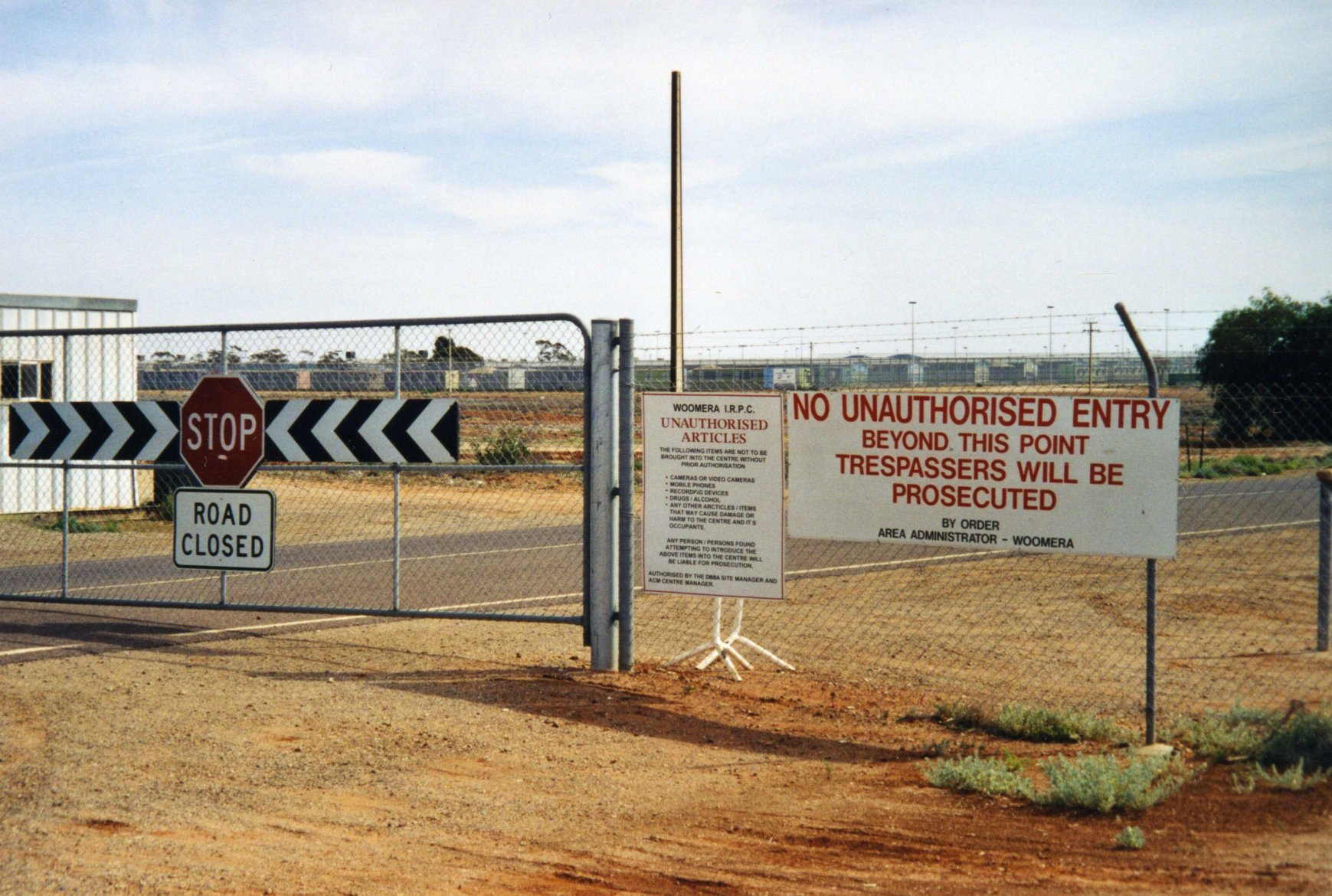
The entrance of the former Woomera IRPC.

Australia is a signatory to the Refugee Convention and a component of the Australian immigration program is devoted to providing protection for refugees. The majority of refugees received by Australia are identified and referred by the UNHCR. The Special Humanitarian Program further offers refuge to people subject to "substantial discrimination amounting to gross violation of human rights in their home country" and who are supported by a proposer within Australia. In 2009–10 a total of 13,770 visas were granted under these categories. The annual figure remained roughly stable for the years between 2004–2010 and accepted applicants from such nations as Myanmar, Iraq, Bhutan, Afghanistan and six African countries.

To varying degrees of success, recent Australian governments have sought to discourage unauthorised arrivals by people seeking refugee status in Australia by maintaining a system of mandatory detention for processing of people who arrive without a visa. In 1992, Australia adopted a policy of under which the Australian government could detain any person in the country without a valid visa. In 1994 the detention of 'unlawful non-citizens' was made mandatory. During the late 1990s and early 2000s, these unauthorised arrivals, popularly referred to as "boat people", were transferred to one of the Australian immigration detention facilities on the Australian mainland, or to Manus Island or Nauru as part of the Pacific Solution. These offshore processing and mandatory detention policies have attracted criticism. In 2014, the Australian Human Rights Commission published a report, which found that many basic rights outlined in the Convention on the Rights of the Child were denied to children living in immigration detention.

Australia's immigration regime has attracted the ire of the United Nations Human Rights Council for "massive abuse [...] of irregular migrants", by suspending habeas corpus, separating families, indefinite detention of irregular migrants and inadequate reception/medical centres. and whilst Australia "remains in active discussions" with the Refugees and Safe, Orderly & Regular Migration components of the Global Compacts on Migration, Prime Minister Morrison stated that the compact will "fundamentally weaken Australia's strong border protection" and will not sign it.Medical evacuation (Medevac) laws have since been passed by parliament. However, Medevac laws have become a point of contention as the local Medevac centre in Kangaroo Point, Brisbane has sparked mass protests after becoming a detention centre that has detained refugees in Brisbane for more than seven years.

Human Rights Watch’s annual human rights report outlined issues in Australia spanning refugee policy, the treatment of Indigenous people and climate change action. The federal government's failure to address the cruel treatment of asylum seekers despite international pressure tarnishes the country's global standing.

=== LGBTI people ===
==== Historical persecution ====
Prior to European contact, there were no known legal or social punishments for engaging in homosexual activity. Sex seems to have been a very open topic among the Indigenous people. Among the Arrernte people, sex plays were particularly ubiquitous, even among young children who would play "mothers and fathers" in a very literal sense. They would typically mimic the sex acts they saw their parents and other adults perform. These acts seem to have been performed regardless of sex. Traditions of "boy-wives" also existed where young boys, typically 14 years of age, would serve as intimate servants of older men until they reached the age of initiation, at which point the young man would have his penis subincised. The Indigenous people did not have the typical Western view of heterosexuality and homosexuality.

As part of the British Empire, Australian colonies inherited anti-homosexuality laws such as the Buggery Act 1533. These provisions were maintained in criminal sodomy laws passed by 19th century colonial parliaments, and subsequently by state parliaments after Federation. Same-sex sexual activity between men was considered a capital crime, resulting in the execution of people convicted of sodomy until 1890.

Different jurisdictions gradually began to reduce the death penalty for sodomy to life imprisonment, with Victoria the last state to reduce the penalty in 1949. Community debate about decriminalising homosexual activity began in the 1960s, with the first lobby groups Daughters of Bilitis, Homosexual Law Reform Society and the Campaign Against Moral Persecution formed in 1969 and 1970.

==== Decriminalisation ====
In October 1973, former Prime Minister John Gorton put forward a motion in the federal House of Representatives that "in the opinion of this House homosexual acts between consenting adults in private should not be subject to the criminal law". All three major parties were given a conscience vote, and the motion was passed by 64 votes to 40:

However, Gorton's motion had no legal effect as the legality of homosexuality was a matter for state and territory governments. Over a 22-year span between 1975 and 1997, the states and territories gradually repealed their sodomy laws as support for gay law reform grew.

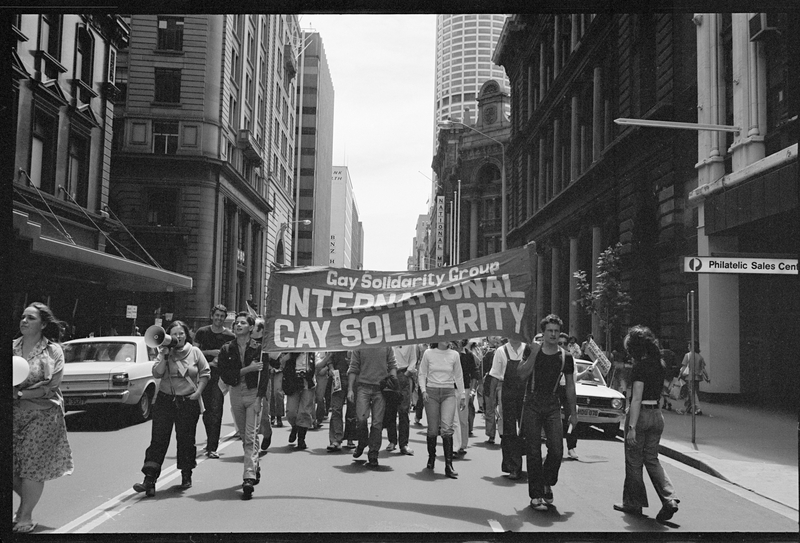
November 1978: Gay Solidarity Group supporters march in the Sydney CBD to protest the Briggs Initiative, which would have effectively banned gay and lesbian teachers in the U.S. state of California.

Nonetheless, under the premiership of Premier Don Dunstan, LGBT rights in South Australia expanded, and South Australia became the first jurisdiction to decriminalise male homosexual activity on 17 September 1975, with the Australian Capital Territory's decriminalisation, first proposed in 1973, approved by the Fraser Federal Government with effect from 4 November 1976. Victoria followed on 23 December 1980, although a "soliciting for immoral purposes" provision added by conservatives saw police harassment continue in that state for some years.

Other jurisdictions to decriminalise male homosexuality were the Northern Territory (effective 4 October 1983), New South Wales (22 May 1984) and (after four failed attempts) Western Australia (7 December 1989). In exchange for decriminalisation, Western Australian conservatives required a higher age of consent and an anti-proselytising provision similar to the United Kingdom's section 28, both since repealed.

Queensland legalised male same-sex activity with effect from 19 January 1991 after the long-standing Nationals government had lost power.

The Tasmanian Government refused to repeal its sodomy law, which led to the case of Toonen v Australia, in which the United Nations Human Rights Committee ruled that sodomy laws violated the International Covenant on Civil and Political Rights. Tasmania's continued refusal to repeal the offending law led the Keating government to pass the Human Rights (Sexual Conduct) Act 1994, which legalised sexual activity between consenting adults throughout Australia and prohibited laws that arbitrarily interfered with the sexual conduct of adults in private.

In the 1997 case of Croome v Tasmania, Rodney Croome applied to the High Court of Australia to strike down the Tasmanian anti-gay law as inconsistent with federal law; after having failed to have the matter thrown out, the Tasmanian Government decriminalised homosexuality on 1 May 1997, becoming the final Australian jurisdiction to do so.

In late 2010, the Gillard Labor government announced that it was undertaking a review of federal anti-discrimination laws, with the aim of introducing a single equality act that would include sexual orientation and gender identity. In 2011, the government introduced new guidelines which would enable sex- and gender-diverse people to record their preferred gender in their passports.

In March 2013, Mark Dreyfus introduced the Sex Discrimination Amendment (Sexual Orientation, Gender Identity and Intersex Status) Bill, and on 25 June 2013, the Australian Federal Parliament passed it with overwhelming support in both houses. The Sex Discrimination Amendment (Sexual Orientation, Gender Identity and Intersex Status) Act 2013 became law from Royal Assent three days later by the Governor-General. It became effective from 1 August 2013, making discrimination against lesbian, gay, bisexual, transgender and for the first time in the world, intersex people, illegal at a national level. Aged care providers who are owned by religious groups would no longer be able to exclude people from aged care services based on their LGBTI or same-sex relationship status. However, religion-based private schools and hospitals are exempt from gender identity and sexual orientation provisions. No religious exemptions exist on the basis of intersex status.

The content of laws relating to the equality of LGBT people is summarised in the following table:

Jurisdiction	Same-sex marriage	De facto relationships status	Registered relationships status	Equal age of consent	Anti-discrimination legislation	Adoption and foster parenting	Recognition of parents on birth certificate	Access to fertility (i.e. IVF and/or Surrogacy)	Right to change legal gender without sex reassignment surgery
Australia	Yes (since 2017)	Yes (family law)	Yes (Covered by state/territory law; available non-marriage relationship registration schemes vary)	Yes (covered by state/territory law)	Yes (Sex Discrimination Amendment (Sexual Orientation, Gender Identity and Intersex Status) Act 2013)	Yes (family law)	Yes (family law)	Yes / No (family law) WA bans surrogacy for same-sex couples.	Yes (2013 under the Australian Government Guidelines on the Recognition of Sex and Gender; otherwise covered by state/territory law)

Jurisdiction	Expungement scheme implemented	Gay panic defence abolished	Conversion therapy banned	Hate crime laws include sexual orientation	Anti-vilification law	Right to change legal gender without sex reassignment surgery
(Australian Capital Territory) ACT	Yes (2015)	Yes (2004)	Yes (Since 2020)	Yes	Yes	Yes
(New South Wales) NSW	Yes (2014)	Yes (2014)	Yes (Since 2025)	Yes	Yes	Yes
(Northern Territory) NT	Yes (2018)	Yes (2006)	No (Proposed)	No	No	Yes
(Queensland) QLD	Yes (2018)	Yes (2017)	Yes (Since 2020)	Yes	Yes	Yes
(South Australia) SA	/ (2013; can apply to have recorded as spent conviction, not expunged)	Yes (2020)	Yes (Since 2025)	Yes	No	Yes
(Tasmania) TAS	Yes (2018)	Yes (2003)	No (Proposed)	Yes	Yes	Yes
(Victoria (state)) VIC	Yes (2015)	Yes (2005)	Yes	Yes	Yes	Yes
(Western Australia) WA	Yes (2018)	Yes (2008)	No (Proposed)	No	No	Yes

==== Intersex people ====
Australia was the first country to conduct a parliamentary inquiry into involuntary or coerced medical interventions on intersex people in October 2013, but the report has not been implemented.

A 2016 Family Court case authorising a gonadectomy and consequential surgery on a young child attracted public commentary for disclosing those medical interventions, their rationales, and a prior clitorectomy and labiaplasty.

In March 2017, Australian and New Zealand community organisations issued a joint call for legal reform, including the criminalisation of deferrable intersex medical interventions on children, an end to legal classification of sex, and improved access to peer support.

Jurisdiction	Physical integrity and bodily autonomy	Reparations	Anti-discrimination protection	Access to identification documents	Access to same rights as other men and women	Changing M/F identification documents	Third gender or sex classifications
Australia	No	No	Yes (2013 for federal protection)	Yes (Federal)	Yes (Exemptions regarding sport)	Yes (Policies vary depending on jurisdiction)	Yes (Opt in at the federal level, state/territory policies vary)

== See also ==
- Human rights in Asia
- List of Sri Lankan Tamil Asylum Seeker Suicides in Australia
