= Discrimination against intersex people =

Intersex people are born with sex characteristics, such as chromosomes, gonads, or genitals that, according to the UN Office of the High Commissioner for Human Rights, "do not fit typical binary notions of male or female bodies". "Because their bodies are seen as different, intersex children and adults are often stigmatized and subjected to multiple human rights violations".

Discriminatory treatment includes infanticide, abandonment, mutilation and neglect, as well as broader concerns regarding the right to life. Intersex people face discrimination in education, employment, healthcare, sport, with an impact on mental and physical health, and on poverty levels, including as a result of harmful medical practices.

United Nations, African Commission on Human and Peoples' Rights, Council of Europe, Inter-American Commission on Human Rights, and other human rights institutions have called for countries to ban discrimination and combat stigma. Few countries so far protect intersex people from discrimination.

== Protection from discrimination ==
Explicit protection on grounds of sex characteristics Explicit protection on grounds of intersex status Explicit protection on grounds of intersex within attribute of sex

A 2013 first international pilot study, Human Rights between the Sexes, by Dan Christian Ghattas, found that intersex people are discriminated against worldwide: "Intersex individuals are considered individuals with a 'disorder' in all areas in which Western medicine prevails. They are more or less obviously treated as sick or 'abnormal', depending on the respective society."

The United Nations states that intersex people may experience stigma on the basis of physical characteristics, "including violations of their rights to health and physical integrity, to be free from torture and ill-treatment, and to equality and non- discrimination." The UN has called for governments to end discrimination against intersex people:

Ban discrimination on the basis of sex characteristics, intersex traits or status, including in education, health care, employment, sports and access to public services, and consult intersex people and organizations when developing legislation and policies that impact their rights.

A handful of jurisdictions so far provide explicit protection from discrimination for intersex people:

- South Africa was the first country to explicitly add intersex to legislation, as part of the attribute of 'sex'.
- Australia was the first country to add an independent attribute, of 'intersex status'.
- Malta was the first to adopt a broader framework of "sex characteristics", through legislation that also ended modifications to the sex characteristics of minors undertaken for social and cultural reasons.
- Since then, several countries in Southeastern Europe have prohibited discrimination based on sex characteristics of intersex status: Albania (since 2020), Bosnia and Herzegovina (since 2016), Greece (since 2015), and Serbia (since 2021) currently prohibit discrimination based on "sex characteristics", while Montenegro prohibits discrimination based on "intersex characteristics" since 2017.
- Iceland bans employment discrimination based on sex characteristics since 2018. The Netherlands (since 2019), Belgium (since 2020) and Denmark (since 2022) also prohibit discrimination based on sex characteristics.
- Pakistan prohibits discrimination against intersex people (khusra) since 2018. India also prohibits discrimination against "person with intersex variations" since 2020.
- Since 2022, Chile is the first Latin American country that provide legal protection from discrimination based on sex characteristics.

=== United Nations Human Rights Council resolution ===
In 2024, the United Nations Human Rights Council voted to adopt its first-ever resolution (put forward by the governments of Australia, Finland, Chile, and South Africa) to protect the rights of intersex people. The resolution, titled, "Combating discrimination, violence and harmful practices against intersex persons", calls for member states to:

Enhance efforts to combat discrimination, violence and harmful practices against persons with innate variations in sex characteristics and address their root causes, such as stereotypes, the spread of misconceptions and inaccurate information, stigma and taboo, and to work to realize the enjoyment of the highest attainable standard of physical and mental health for persons with innate variations in sex characteristics.

In addition, the resolution also requests that the UN High Commissioner for Human Rights publishes a report "examining in detail discriminatory laws and policies, acts of violence and harmful practices against persons with innate variations in sex characteristics, in all regions of the world." The resolution, passed with twenty-four votes in favour and twenty-three abstentions, has been praised by various human rights and intersex advocacy organizations, including ILGA, Human Rights Watch, OII Europe and InterACT.

== Right to life ==
Intersex people face genetic de-selection via pregnancy terminations and preimplantation genetic diagnosis, as well as abandonment, neglect, infanticide and murder due to their sex characteristics. In 2015, the Council of Europe published an Issue Paper on Human rights and intersex people, remarking:

Intersex people's right to life can be violated in discriminatory "sex selection" and "preimplantation genetic diagnosis, other forms of testing, and selection for particular characteristics". Such de-selection or selective abortions are incompatible with ethics and human rights standards due to the discrimination perpetrated against intersex people on the basis of their sex characteristics.

In 2015, Chinese news reported a case of abandonment of an infant, thought likely due to its sex characteristics. Hong Kong activist Small Luk reports that this is not uncommon, in part due to the historic imposition of a policy of one child per family. Cases of infanticide, attempted infanticide, and neglect have been reported in China, Uganda and Pakistan.

Kenyan reports suggest that the birth of an intersex infant may be viewed as a curse. In 2015, it was reported that an intersex Kenyan adolescent, Muhadh Ishmael, was mutilated and later died. Ishmael had previously been described as a curse on his family.

== Medical ==
In places with accessible healthcare systems, intersex people may be subjected to social or medical practices that human rights organizations describe as harmful, including involuntary or coercive treatment. In places without accessible healthcare systems, reports have found cases of infanticide, abandonment and non consensual procedures.

=== Physical integrity and bodily autonomy ===
Intersex people face involuntary or coerced medical treatment from infancy. Where these occur without personal informed consent, these are "violations of their rights to health and physical integrity, to be free from torture and ill-treatment, and to equality and non-discrimination."

A 2016 Australian study of 272 people born with atypical sex characteristics found that 60% had received medical treatment on the basis of their sex characteristics, half receiving such treatments aged under 18 years, "most commonly genital surgeries (many of which occurred in infancy) and hormone treatments", and the "majority experienced at least one negative impact". Overall, while some parents and physicians had attempted to empower participants, the study found "strong evidence suggesting a pattern of institutionalised shaming and coercive treatment" and poor (or no) information provision. 16% of study participants were not provided with information on options of having no treatment, and some were provided with misinformation about the nature of their treatment, and information about peer support was also lacking. OII Europe reports:

A German study conducted by a medical team between 2005 and 2007 covered the experiences of 439 intersex individuals of all ages, from Germany, Austria and Switzerland. 81% had been subjected to one or multiple surgeries due to their DSD diagnosis. Almost 50% of the participating adults reported psychological problems and a variety of problems related to their physical well-being and their sex life. Two-thirds made a connection between those problems and the medical and surgical treatment they had been subjected to. Participating children reported significant disturbances, especially within their family life and in relation with their physical well-being.

Medical decisions may be influenced by parental concerns, or problematize future gender identity and sexuality, and subjective judgements are made about the acceptability of risk of future gender dysphoria. Medical professionals have traditionally considered the worst outcomes after genital reconstruction in infancy to occur when the person develops a gender identity discordant with the sex assigned as an infant. Human rights institutions question such approaches as being "informed by redundant social constructs around gender and biology".

Decision-making on any cancer and other physical risks may be intertwined with "normalizing" rationales. In a major Parliamentary report in Australia, published in October 2013, the Senate Community Affairs References committee was "disturbed" by the possible implications of current practices in the treatment of cancer risk. The committee stated: "clinical intervention pathways stated to be based on probabilities of cancer risk may be encapsulating treatment decisions based on other factors, such as the desire to conduct normalising surgery... Treating cancer may be regarded as unambiguously therapeutic treatment, while normalising surgery may not. Thus basing a decision on cancer risk might avoid the need for court oversight in a way that a decision based on other factors might not. The committee is disturbed by the possible implications of this..."

Despite the naming of clinician statements as "consensus" statements, there remains no clinical consensus about the conduct of surgical interventions, nor their evidence base, surgical timing, necessity, type of surgical intervention, and degree of difference warranting intervention. Surgery may adversely impact physical sensation and capacity for intimacy; however, research has suggested that parents are willing to consent to appearance-altering surgeries even at the cost of later adult sexual sensation. Other research shows that parents may make different choices with non-medicalized information. Child rights experts suggest that parents have no right to consent to such treatments.

Clinical decision-making is frequently portrayed as a choice between early or later surgical interventions, while human rights advocates and some clinicians portray concerns as matters of consent and autonomy.

=== Conversion therapy ===
Intersex LGBTQ+ people are more likely to experience conversion therapy compared to endosex LGBTQ+ people. In a Trevor Project survey of LGBTQ+ youth in the U.S., 13% of intersex LGBTQ+ respondents experienced conversion therapy compared to 7% of endosex LGBTQ+ respondents. People who attempted to perform conversion therapy included parents, healthcare providers, mental health providers, religious leaders, and teachers/school counselors. Those who experienced conversion therapy were more likely to have attempted suicide in the past year, with 43% of intersex LGBTQ youth who experienced conversion therapy having attempted suicide compared to 22% of intersex LGBTQ youth who have not experienced conversion therapy.

=== Medical photography and display ===
Photographs of intersex children's genitalia are circulated in medical communities for documentary purposes, and individuals with intersex traits may be subjected to repeated genital examinations and display to medical teams. Sharon Preves described this as a form of humiliation and stigmatization, leading to an "inability to deflect negative associations of self" where "genitalia must be revealed in order to allow for stigmatization". According to Creighton et al, the "experience of being photographed has exemplified for many people with intersex conditions the powerlessness and humiliation felt during medical investigations and interventions".

=== Access to medical services ===
Adults with intersex variations report poor mental health due to experiences of medicalization, with many individuals avoiding care as a result. Many Australian study participants stated a need to educate their physicians. Similar reports are made elsewhere: reports on the situation in Mexico suggests that adults may not receive adequate care, including lack of understanding about intersex bodies and examinations that cause physical harm.

In countries without accessible healthcare systems, infanticide, abandonment and mutilation may occur. Access to necessary medical services, for example due to cancer or urinary issues, is also limited.

== Threats to safety ==
=== Violence and sexual abuse ===
According to the 2023 EU LGBTIQ survey, 32 percent of intersex respondents experienced violence or sexual assault due to being LGBTIQ in the past 5 years. 70 percent reported receiving offensive or threatening comments about being LGBTIQ in the previous year. Social stigma associated with intersex traits may be linked to an increased risk of sexual or intimate partner violence. An abuser may take advantage of the victims intersex status by threatening to tell others that the victim is intersex, pressuring the victim to conform to certain gender roles, pressuring the victim into medical treatments to change their body, denying the victim's sexual orientation because they are intersex, or accusing the victim of tricking them due to their body looking different than what the abuser thinks it should look like. Abusive family members who perceive their intersex child as shameful may use rape as a form of punishment. Intersex women may be victims of sexual violence referred to as "corrective rape." Corrective rape is seen as a form of therapy towards women who break with heteronormative expectations. This may include women whose bodies are perceived as not fitting expected sex or gender norms. Intersex women can be victims of corrective rape due to perpetrators thinking they don't look "female enough."

=== Inciting hate crimes by allegations of sex crimes ===
One increasingly common cause of hate crimes against intersex people is the neurological claim that male and female brains have fundamentally different sexualities, in particular the claim that men are sexually impulsive and aggressive and bound to act on their sexual fantasies while most women are said to have a wider range of sexual fantasies than most men, including fantasies that it would be unacceptable to act on. The claim that a combination of one trait that most men have and one trait that most women have would produce a sex criminal adds up to allegations that intersex people are sex offenders. To decrease such severe discrimination against intersex people, some researchers advocate more public information about the error sources in the sexological studies that are said to show such sex differences. This includes the possibility that societal double standards may scare more men than women into not talking about or otherwise revealing their sex fantasies (corroborated by the existence of characteristics that differ between male volunteers and male nonvolunteers, but not between female volunteers and female nonvolunteers, in erotica research) giving a false appearance of men having narrower ranges of sexual fantasies than women, and the possibility that men who want to be castrated out of their spiritual beliefs may have to commit sex crimes and claim that it was due to uncontrollable urges to get castrated since such surgery is not off the shelf (corroborated by the overrepresentation of religious groups in child sexual abuse scandals that cannot be explained by biopsychiatric correlations) creating a false appearance of men being less able to control their sexual impulses than women. Certain intersex rights advocates argue that this may dispel the myth that intersex people are "hybrid degenerated" to be sex criminals, creating more understanding for intersex people.

== Suicide and self-harm ==
Research has suggested that discrimination and stigma may be linked to higher reported rates of self harm and suicidal ideation. Reports from Hong Kong and Kenya have described suicide related concerns in intersex populations. The Australian sociological study of 272 people born with atypical sex characteristics found that 60% had thought about suicide, and 42% thought about self-harm, "on the basis of issues related to having an intersex variation ... 19% had attempted suicide"; causes identified included stigma, discrimination, family rejection and school bullying. Similarly, data from Mexico found higher rate of suicidal ideation and intention among intersex individuals.

A 2013 German clinical study found high rates of distress, with "prevalence rates of self-harming behavior and suicidal tendencies ... comparable to traumatized women with a history of physical or sexual abuse." Similar results have been reported in Australia and Denmark.

== Education ==
An Australian sociological survey of 272 persons born with atypical sex characteristics, published in 2016, found that 18% of respondents (compared to an Australian average of 2%) failed to complete secondary school, with early school leaving coincident with pubertal medical interventions, bullying on the basis of physical characteristics, and other factors. A Kenyan news report suggests high rates of early school leaving, with the organisation Gama Africa reporting that 60% of 132 known intersex people had dropped out of school "because of the harassment and treatment they received from their peers and their teachers".

The Australian study found that schools lacked inclusive services such as relevant puberty and sex education curricula and counselling, for example, not representing a full range of human bodily diversity. Only a quarter of respondents felt positive about their schooling experiences, schooling coincided with disclosure of an intersex condition, associated with well-being risks, and early school leaving peaked "during the years most associated with puberty and hormone therapy interventions". Cognitive differences may also be associated with some traits such as sex chromosome variations. Nevertheless, in addition to very high rates of early school leaving, the Australian study also found that a higher proportion of study participants completed undergraduate or postgraduate degrees compared to the general Australian population.

== Poverty and employment discrimination ==
Research suggests that discrimination and stigma may be associated with higher poverty rates in some intersex groups. A 2015 Australian survey of people born with atypical sex characteristics found high levels of poverty, in addition to very high levels of early school leaving, and higher than average rates of disability. 6% of the 272 survey participants reported being homeless or couch surfing.

OII Europe states that "stigma, structural and verbal discrimination, harassment" as well as harmful practices and lack of legal recognition can lead to "inadequate education, broken careers and poverty (including homelessness) due to pathologisation and related trauma, a disturbed family life due to taboo and medicalisation, lack of self-esteem and a high risk of becoming suicidal."

An Employers guide to intersex inclusion published by Pride in Diversity and Organisation Intersex International Australia discloses cases of discrimination in employment. Researchers have also documented frequent experiences of workplaces rejection among intersex individuals in Mexico, including social exclusion, offensive comments, harassment, unequal treatment, and violence. Similarly, a study from Chile estimated that intersex individuals belong to households with incomes that are substantially lower than those of endosex male individuals.

== Legal ==
Like all individuals, some intersex individuals may be raised as a particular sex (male or female) but then identify with another later in life, while most do not. Like non-intersex people, some intersex individuals may not identify themselves as either exclusively female or exclusively male. A 2012 clinical review suggests that between 8.5 and 20% of persons with intersex conditions may experience gender dysphoria, while sociological research in Australia, a country with a third 'X' sex classification, shows that 19% of people born with atypical sex characteristics selected an "X" or "other" option, while 52% are women, 23% men and 6% unsure.

Depending on the jurisdiction, access to any birth certificate may be an issue, including a birth certificate with a sex marker. The Asia Pacific Forum of National Human Rights Institutions states that:

Recognition before the law means having legal personhood and the legal protections that flow from that. For intersex people, this is neither primarily nor solely about amending birth registrations or other official documents. Firstly, it is about intersex people who have been issued a male or a female birth certificate being able to enjoy the same legal rights as other men and women

Access to a birth certificate with a correct sex marker may be an issue for people who do not identify with their sex assigned at birth, or it may only be available accompanied by surgical requirements.

The passports and identification documents of Australia and some other nationalities have adopted "X" as a valid third category besides "M" (male) and "F" (female), at least since 2003. In 2013, Germany became the first European nation to allow babies with characteristics of both sexes to be registered as indeterminate gender on birth certificates, amidst opposition and skepticism from intersex organisations who point out that the law appears to mandate exclusion from male or female categories. The Council of Europe acknowledged this approach, and concerns about recognition of third and blank classifications in a 2015 Issue Paper, stating that these may lead to "forced outings" and "lead to an increase in pressure on parents of intersex children to decide in favour of one sex." The Issue Paper argues that "further reflection on non-binary legal identification is necessary".

In 2026, Niger enacted a new penal code that criminalises intersex "practices".

== Sport ==
Women who have, or are perceived to have intersex traits are subject to stigmatization, humiliation and media scrutiny. Currently suspended IAAF regulations on hyperandrogenism "mandated that national Olympic committees 'actively investigate any perceived deviation in sex characteristics'" in women athletes.

In 2013, it was disclosed in a medical journal that four unnamed elite female athletes from countries with limited healthcare access were subjected to gonadectomies (sterilization) and partial clitoridectomies (female genital mutilation) after testosterone testing revealed that they had an intersex condition. Testosterone testing was introduced in the wake of the Caster Semenya case, of a South African runner subjected to testing due to her appearance and vigor. There is no evidence that innate hyperandrogenism in elite women athletes confers an advantage in sport. While Australia protects intersex persons from discrimination, the Act contains an exemption in sport.

== LGBT ==
Intersex people may face discrimination within LGBT settings and multiple organizations have highlighted appeals to LGBT rights recognition that fail to address the issue of unnecessary "normalising" treatments on intersex children, using the portmanteau term "pinkwashing".

Emi Koyama has described how inclusion of intersex in LGBTI can fail to address intersex-specific human rights issues, including creating false impressions "that intersex people's rights are protected" by laws protecting LGBT people, and failing to acknowledge that many intersex people are not LGBT. Julius Kaggwa of SIPD Uganda has written that, while the gay community "offers us a place of relative safety, it is also oblivious to our specific needs". Mauro Cabral has written that transgender people and organizations "need to stop approaching intersex issues as if they were trans issues" including use of intersex as a means of explaining being transgender; "we can collaborate a lot with the intersex movement by making it clear how wrong that approach is".

Organisation Intersex International Australia states that some intersex individuals are same sex attracted, and some are heterosexual, but "LGBTI activism has fought for the rights of people who fall outside of expected binary sex and gender norms" but, in June 2016, the same organization pointed to contradictory statements by Australian governments, suggesting that the dignity and rights of LGBTI (LGBT and intersex) people are recognized while, at the same time, harmful practices on intersex children continue.

In August 2016, Zwischengeschlecht described actions to promote equality or civil status legislation without action on banning "intersex genital mutilations" as a form of pinkwashing. The organization has previously highlighted evasive government statements to UN Treaty Bodies that conflate intersex, transgender and LGBT issues, instead of addressing harmful practices on infants.

== Protections and rights by continent and jurisdiction ==
=== Africa ===
Country/jurisdiction	Physical integrity and bodily autonomy	Anti-discrimination protection	Access to identification documents	Access to same rights as other men and women	Changing M/F identification documents	Third gender or sex classifications	Ending official classification by sex or gender	Sex and gender distinctions	Assign infants and children to male or female
Kenya	Since 2022 Yes	No	Yes			Since 2022 Yes			
South Africa	No	Yes	Yes	Yes	Yes Subject to medical and social reports				
Uganda	No	No			Yes				
Nigeria	No	No	No		No				

=== Americas ===
Country/jurisdiction	Physical integrity and bodily autonomy	Anti-discrimination protection	Access to identification documents	Access to same rights as other men and women	Changing M/F identification documents	Third gender or sex classifications	Ending official classification by sex or gender	Sex and gender distinctions	Assign infants and children to male or female
Argentina	No	No			Yes Self-determination	Yes Since July 2021, gender X became available and implemented			
Canada	No	No	Yes		Yes Self-determination	Yes Also available for Canadian passport holders with male, female and X options.			
Chile	Yes	Yes	Yes		Yes Self-determination	Yes			
Colombia	No No, but restricted in children aged over 5.	No			Yes Self-determination				
Mexico	No	No				Yes Since May 2023, a gender X option formally became available on Passports within Mexico - alongside male and female options.			
United States	No	Partial, in healthcare		No Laws on female genital mutilation not enforced		Yes / No Opt in only for Washington D.C., California, New York City, Ohio (with a court order only), New Mexico, Nevada, Oregon, Utah (with a court order only), Washington State, New Jersey, Colorado, and Michigan. US Passports since January 2025 had no longer issued the gender X option, keeping previously-issued gender X passports still valid; however, in June 2025, per court order, "X"-gender passports started being issued again. Firearms transfer ATF forms and documents also have male, female and non-binary options since 2021.			
Uruguay	Yes				Yes Self-determination	Yes			

=== Asia ===
Country/jurisdiction	Physical integrity and bodily autonomy	Anti-discrimination protection	Access to identification documents	Access to same rights as other men and women	Changing M/F identification documents	Third gender or sex classifications	Ending official classification by sex or gender	Sex and gender distinctions	Assign infants and children to male or female
Bangladesh	No	No				Yes			
China	No	No							
India	No	No			Yes	Yes			
Japan	No	No			Requires surgery				
Nepal	No	No			Yes	Yes			
Pakistan	No	Yes			Yes Self-determination	Yes			
South Korea	No	No			Yes				
Thailand	No	No			Requires surgery				
Vietnam	No	No			Requires surgery				

=== Europe ===
Country/jurisdiction	Physical integrity and bodily autonomy	Anti-discrimination protection	Access to identification documents	Access to same rights as other men and women	Changing M/F identification documents	Third gender or sex classifications	Ending official classification by sex or gender	Sex and gender distinctions	Assign infants and children to male or female
Albania	Yes	Yes							
Austria						Yes			
Bosnia and Herzegovina	No	Yes							
Belgium					Yes Self-determination				
Denmark	No	No			Yes Self-determination	No			
Finland	No	Yes			Yes Self-determination	No			
France	No	No				No			
Germany	Yes with exceptions	No			Yes Self-determination	Yes			
Greece	No	Yes			Yes Self-determination				
Iceland	No	Yes			Yes Self-determination	Yes			
(Republic of Ireland) Ireland	No	No			Yes Self-determination	No			
Jersey	No	Yes							
Luxembourg					Yes				
Malta	Yes Legislated	Yes	Yes	Yes	Yes Self-determination	Yes			
Montenegro	No	Yes	No	No	No	No	No	No	No
Netherlands		Yes							
Norway		No			Yes Self-determination				
Portugal	No Legislated	Yes	Yes	Yes	Yes Self-determination	Yes			
Serbia	No	Yes							
Sweden		Yes			Yes Self-determination effective from July 1, 2025 - under enacted April 2024 legislation passed in Sweden				
Switzerland	No	No			Yes Self-determination	No			
United Kingdom	No	No			No Requires diagnosis of gender dysphoria	No			

=== Oceania ===
Country/jurisdiction	Physical integrity and bodily autonomy	Anti-discrimination protection	Access to identification documents	Access to same rights as other men and women	Changing M/F identification documents	Third gender or sex classifications	Ending official classification by sex or gender	Sex and gender distinctions	Assign infants and children to male or female
Australia	No	Yes At federal level		No Exemptions regarding sport and female genital mutilation	Yes Policies vary depending on jurisdiction Requires sexual reassignment surgery since 1996 within NSW - until June 30, 2025. "Appropriate clinical treatment" required in NT, SA and WA. Self-determination in ACT, VIC, TAS, QLD (and NSW effective from July 1, 2025).	Yes (Passports) Yes Opt in at federal level, state/territory policies vary			
New Zealand	No	No (Under sex, however indirectly implied under the Human Rights Act 1993)		No Exemptions regarding female genital mutilation	Yes Self-determination	Yes (Passports) (Third birth certificate may be used if determined at birth)			

== See also ==
- Intersex human rights
- Intersex medical interventions
- Intersex rights by country
- Legal recognition of intersex people
- Sexual characteristics
- Endosex
