= Alex MacFarlane =

Australian activist

- Born: Victoria, Australia
- Known for: Being the first known person to hold passport with X sex marker

Alex MacFarlane is an Australian activist and an intersex person born with XXY sex chromosomes. Born in Victoria, MacFarlane is believed to be the first holder of an indeterminate birth certificate and passport.

== Birth certificate and passport ==
MacFarlane is believed to be the first person in Australia to obtain a birth certificate recording sex as indeterminate, and the first Australian passport with an 'X' sex marker in 2003. MacFarlane was reported as receiving a passport with an 'X' sex descriptor in early 2003.

This was stated by the West Australian newspaper to be on the basis of a challenge by MacFarlane, using an indeterminate birth certificate issued by the State of Victoria. The West Australian newspaper reported in January 2003 that the Department of Foreign Affairs and Trade "had decided to accommodate people whose birth certificates recorded their sex as indeterminate... MacFarlane is also believed to be the first Australian issued with a birth certificate acknowledging a gender other than male or female, which says 'indeterminate – also known as intersex'". It was issued in MacFarlane‘s birth state of Victoria, which unlike WA, changed its policy to allow the category.

Several other Australians are known to have adopted sex non-specific or indeterminate identification documents subsequently, including Tony Briffa, and Norrie May-Welby.

== See also ==
- Intersex human rights
- Legal recognition of intersex people
- Intersex rights in Australia
