= Intersex rights in Australia =

Overview of intersex people's rights in Australia

- Australia
- Protection of physical integrity and bodily autonomy: No
- Protection from discrimination: Federal, some States
- Access to identification documents: Yes
- Access to same rights as other men and women: No
- Changing M/F sex classifications: Yes
- Third gender or sex classifications: Yes
- Marriage: Yes
- Rights by country: Argentina; Australia; Canada; Chile; China; Colombia; France; Germany; Kenya; Malta; Mexico; Nepal; New Zealand; South Africa; Spain; Switzerland; Taiwan; Uganda; United Kingdom; United States

Intersex rights in Australia are protections and rights afforded to intersex people through statutes, regulations, and international human rights treaties, including through the Sex Discrimination Act 1984 (Cth) which makes it unlawful to discriminate against a person based upon that person's intersex status in contexts such as work, education, provision of services, and accommodation.

Australia was the first country to conduct a parliamentary inquiry into involuntary or coerced medical interventions on intersex people. A 2016 Family Court case authorising a gonadectomy and consequential surgery on a young child has attracted public commentary for disclosing those medical interventions, their rationales, and a prior clitorectomy and labiaplasty.

In March 2017, Australian and New Zealand community organizations issued a joint call for legal reform, including the criminalization of deferrable intersex medical interventions on children, an end to legal classification of sex, and improved access to peer support.

== History ==
Early common law, like canon law, held that hermaphrodites were to be treated as male or female depending on the prevailing sex. However, in 1979 the Family Court of Australia annulled the marriage of an intersex man who had been "born a male and had been reared as a male" on the basis that he was an hermaphrodite.

Intersex Peer Support Australia (formerly the Androgen Insensitivity Syndrome Support Group Australia) is thought to be world's oldest intersex civil society organization, founded in 1985. Intersex Human Rights Australia (formerly OII Australia) was established in 2009. The two organizations have campaigned for political recognition and bodily autonomy, with some success.

Alex MacFarlane is believed to be amongst the first people worldwide to legally secure a birth certificate and passport recording sex as indeterminate, reported in January 2003. Phoebe Hart directed the award-winning autobiographical road trip movie Orchids, My Intersex Adventure with her sister, Bonnie Hart, in 2010, promoting awareness of intersex issues. Tony Briffa became the world's first openly intersex mayor, and "the first known intersex public office-bearer in the Western world", serving as Deputy Mayor of the City of Hobsons Bay, Victoria, between 2009 and 2011, and Mayor between 2011 and 2012.

In 2013, Australia became the first country to pass a standalone attribute protecting intersex people in anti-discrimination law, and the first to conduct a parliamentary inquiry into intersex medical interventions. In 2014, Morgan Carpenter took part in the "first United Nations Human Rights Council side event on intersex issues" in March 2014, alongside Mauro Cabral and representatives of Intersex UK and Zwischengeschlecht.

However, while Australian terminology has expanded from "LGBT" to "LGBTI" to include intersex people, the experience of intersex people remains poorly understood. In June 2016, Intersex Human Rights Australia made a submission to the UN Committee Against Torture which stated that the dignity and rights of LGBT and intersex people are recognized while what it and the UN Committee state to be harmful practices on intersex children continue.

=== Darlington Statement ===
In March 2017, representatives of Intersex Peer Support Australia, Intersex Trust Aotearoa New Zealand, and Intersex Human Rights Australia participated in an Australian and Aotearoa/New Zealand consensus "Darlington Statement" by intersex community organizations and others. The statement calls for legal reform, including the criminalization of deferrable intersex medical interventions on children, an end to legal classification of sex, and improved access to peer support.

== Physical integrity and bodily autonomy ==
Legal prohibition of non-consensual medical interventions Regulatory suspension or limitation of harmful practices Legal prohibition in at least one state/province

Intersex infants are often subjected to medical operations to their genitalia and other sex characteristics to make them conform to a male or female appearance or nature. These practices have been criticised by human rights institutions and practitioners, and intersex advocates, as human rights abuses, violating rights to live free from violence and harmful practices, and rights to bodily autonomy, integrity and dignity, drawing parallels to female genital mutilation.

=== Decision-making principles ===
Decision-making principles were published in 2010 by Gillam, Hewitt and Warne, three clinicians associated with the Royal Children's Hospital, Melbourne and Murdoch Children's Research Institute. The principles include minimizing "psychosocial risks" to children through medical intervention, including risks of "impaired bonding" with parents and "reduced opportunities for marriage". The guidelines were criticized by Alice Dreger and two colleagues for being focused on infant genital surgeries. Gillam, Hewitt and Warne stated in 2011 that the principles were then being extended nationally, that is, they were now "being extended to other centres in Australia".

The government of Victoria produced a "derivative" version in 2013. This later version was criticised by one academic and Intersex Human Rights Australia for being irrelevant to clinical practice. Victoria later removed a "psychosocial" rationale for intersex medical interventions focused on "marriageability".

=== Senate report on involuntary or coerced sterilization ===
In October 2013, the Australian Senate Community Affairs References Committee published a report entitled Involuntary or coerced sterilisation of intersex people in Australia. The Senate found that "normalising" surgeries are taking place in Australia, often on infants and young children. The Report stated:

normalisation surgery is more than physical reconstruction. The surgery is intended to deconstruct an intersex physiology and, in turn, construct an identity that conforms with stereotypical male and female gender categories...

The evidence suggests that a human rights consistent framework ... must necessarily operate from a presumption in favour of maintaining the status quo for as long as possible...

Enormous effort has gone into assigning and 'normalising' sex: none has gone into asking whether this is necessary or beneficial. Given the extremely complex and risky medical treatments that are sometimes involved, this appears extremely unfortunate.

The committee made 15 recommendations, including that:

- medical treatment of intersex people take place under guidelines that ensure treatment is managed within a human rights framework, and which "favour deferral of normalising treatment until the person can give fully informed consent, and seek to minimise surgical intervention on infants undertaken for primarily psychosocial reasons"; and
- proposed intersex medical interventions on children and adults without the capacity to consent should require legal authorisation by an administrative tribunal or the Family Court of Australia.

The recommendations have not been adopted.

=== Re: Carla (Medical procedure) ===
In December 2016, The Australian and SBS reported on a Family Court of Australia case published in January 2016, Re Carla (Medical procedure), where the parents were able to authorize the sterilization of their 5-year child with 17-beta-hydroxysteroid dehydrogenase III deficiency. The child had previously been subjected to intersex medical interventions including a clitorectomy and labiaplasty, without requiring Court oversight. These were described by the judge as having "enhanced the appearance of her female genitalia".

Intersex Human Rights Australia found this "disturbing", and stated that the case was reliant on gender stereotyping and failed to take account of data on cancer risks, and demonstrating a lack of scrutiny and transparency in the treatment of intersex infants and children. A commentary by the Human Rights Law Centre described the case as a "particularly disturbing misapplication of the principles in Re Marion".

Numerous academics have commented on the issues raised by the case. Bernadette Richards wrote that it stretched the bounds of parental authority by removing "external review of invasive treatment". Melinda Jones has compared the interventions in this and other cases to female genital mutilation. Fiona Kelly and Malcolm Smith have written that the evidence put to the Court was incomplete, and its reasoning lacked rigor. Morgan Carpenter has written that the case demonstrated a "failed narrative of continuous" clinical "technical improvement".

=== Responses to developments ===
On 11 November 2014, the New South Wales Legislative Council passed a motion recognising stigma and human rights abuses, and calling on that State government to "work with the Australian Government to implement the recommendations" of the 2013 Senate committee report.

The Asia Pacific Forum of National Human Rights Institutions states that Australian regulations that prohibit female genital mutilation give "explicit permission for genital surgeries to 'normalise' the bodies of intersex infants and children". In the same month, the United Nations Committee Against Torture asked the Australian government to confirm whether or not such medical interventions persist, and asking about implementation of the 2013 Senate report.

In December 2016, the United Nations Committee Against Torture asked the Australian government to confirm the availability of civil and criminal remedies for irreversible medical interventions as children, including the applicability of statutes of limitations. In March 2017, an Australian and Aotearoa/New Zealand community statement called for acknowledgement, an apology, and compensation for intersex people who have been subjected to "involuntary or coercive medical interventions".

In March 2017, an Australian and Aotearoa/New Zealand community statement called for the criminalization of deferrable intersex medical interventions. In June 2017, and in response to a joint submission by almost 50 non-governmental organizations, the UN Committee on Economic Social and Cultural Rights stated concern that "children born with intersex variations are subject to early surgeries and medical interventions before they are able to provide full and informed consent", calling for implementation of the 2013 Senate report. The United Nations Human Rights Committee recommended in December 2017 that Australia "move to end irreversible medical treatment, especially surgery, of intersex infants and children, who are not yet able to provide fully informed and free consent, unless such procedures constitute an absolute medical necessity". In July 2018, the UN Committee on the Elimination of Discrimination against Women issued concluding observations on harmful practices, recommending that Australia adopt "Adopt clear legislative provisions explicitly prohibiting the performance of unnecessary surgical or other medical treatment on intersex children before they reach the legal age of consent". The committee also called for implementation of the 2013 Senate committee report, the provision of redress, counselling and support to families. In mid 2018, the Australian Human Rights Commission commenced a project on protecting the rights of Australians born with variations in sex characteristics in the context of medical interventions.

In 2023, the Australian Capital Territory became the first place in Australia to outlaw surgeries that are deferrable from being performed on intersex children without their consent.

== Protection from discrimination ==
Explicit protection from discrimination on grounds of sex characteristics Explicit protection on grounds of intersex status Explicit protection on grounds of intersex within attribute of sex

At the federal level, "intersex status" became a protected attribute in the federal Sex Discrimination Act 1984 (Cth), making it unlawful to discriminate against a person based upon that person's intersex status in contexts such as work, education, provision of services, and accommodation. The Act defines intersex status as:

the status of having physical, hormonal or genetic features that are: (a) neither wholly female nor wholly male; or (b) a combination of female and male; or (c) neither female nor male.

The Act contains exemptions in religion and sport. A religious exemption applies solely to the internal appointment, training or practices within religious bodies. Exemptions apply to competitive sport in certain instances, but this is not applicable to sporting activities involving children aged less than 12 years old, or persons participating in coaching, refereeing, or administering sporting activities.

Tasmania has also passed legislation precluding discrimination on the basis of intersex status, and similar legislative amendments passed in the Australian Capital Territory and South Australia, went into full effect in 2017. Furthermore, in 2019, Tasmania replaced the attribute of intersex status with the more internationally accepted attribute of sex characteristics, becoming the first Australian jurisdiction to do so. Intersex Human Rights Australia has expressed concern about a lack of public awareness of these protections.

Research on intersex Australians published in 2016 shows that, while 2% of Australians fail to complete secondary school, 18% of Australians born with intersex variations fail to do so due to issues around bullying, discrimination and pubertal medical interventions.

In 2014, Intersex Human Rights Australia and Pride in Diversity partnered to publish a guide on intersex employees for employers.

== Identification documents ==
Australian research has shown that 19% of people born with atypical sex characteristics selected an "X" or "other" classification, while 52% are women and 23% men and 6% unsure.

Alex MacFarlane received the first Australian passport with an 'X' sex descriptor, reported in January 2003. Australian government policy between 2003 and 2011 was to issue passports with an 'X' marker only to people who could "present a birth certificate that notes their sex as indeterminate" In 2011, the Australian Passport Office introduced new guidelines for issuing of passports with a new gender, and broadened the availability of the X descriptor to all individuals with documented "indeterminate" sex. From 2013, federal guidelines enable all people to identify gender as male, female or X on federal documents, including passports. Documentary evidence must be witnessed by a doctor or psychologist, but medical intervention is not required.

In Australia, birth certificates are issued by States and Territories. Intersex Human Rights Australia states that identification changes are managed as an administrative correction.

Alex MacFarlane is also believed to be the first person in Australia to obtain a birth certificate recording sex as indeterminate, reported in January 2003.

In March 2017, an Australian and Aotearoa/New Zealand community statement called for an end to legal classification of sex, stating that legal third classifications, like binary classifications, were based on structural violence and failed to respect diversity and a "right to self-determination".

== Marriage ==
Marriage regardless of sex, gender or intersex status has been legally recognised in Australia since 9 December 2017. The Marriage Amendment (Definition and Religious Freedoms) Act 2017 permits any "2 people" to marry.

Prior to that date, marriage was only permitted between a "man and a woman", meaning that intersex people who had other sex classifications, or sex classifications that matched their partner, could not legally marry each other.

Historically, two legal cases are known to involve the marriages of intersex people. In the early twentieth century, the marriage of missionary Florrie Cox was annulled due to "malformation frigidity". In 1979, the Family Court of Australia, annulled the marriage of an intersex man, who had been "born a male and had been reared as a male" on the basis that he was an hermaphrodite.

== Right to life ==
Intersex Peer Support Australia and Intersex Human Rights Australia have expressed concerns about the use of genetic selection via preimplantation genetic diagnosis, including in submissions to the National Health and Medical Research Council recommending that deselection of embryos and foetuses on grounds of intersex status should not be permitted. The organisations have also expressed concern about pregnancy termination rates of up to 88% in 47,XXY in circumstances where the World Health Organization describes the intersex trait as "compatible with normal life expectancy", and "often undiagnosed".

In 2016, Intersex Human Rights Australia wrote about the sponsorship of lesbian, gay, bisexual, transgender and intersex (LGBTI) events by IVF clinics in Australia, stating that, in addition to ethical issues raised by the elimination of intersex traits, "sponsorship of 'LGBTI' events by such businesses raises more ethical issues still, including the nature of community and comprehension of issues relating to intersex bodily diversity."

== Rights advocacy ==
Notable intersex rights organizations in Australia include Intersex Human Rights Australia (formerly OII Australia) and Intersex Peer Support Australia (formerly Androgen Insensitivity Syndrome Support Group Australia). Notable advocates include Tony Briffa, Morgan Carpenter, Bonnie Hart, Phoebe Hart, Alex MacFarlane and Gina Wilson.

== See also ==
- Intersex human rights
- LGBT rights in Australia
- Transgender rights in Australia
- Human rights in Australia

== Bibliography ==
- Australian Senate Community Affairs Committee (October 2013). Involuntary or coerced sterilisation of intersex people in Australia. ISBN 978-1-74229-917-4.
- Australian Human Rights Commission. Resilient Individuals: Sexual Orientation, Gender Identity & Intersex Rights National Consultation Report 2015 (PDF).
- Asia Pacific Forum of National Human Rights Institutions (June 2016). Promoting and Protecting Human Rights in relation to Sexual Orientation, Gender Identity and Sex Characteristics. ISBN 978-0-9942513-7-4. Archived from the original on 15 January 2017.
- Briffa, Tony (15 April 2004). "Intersex surgery disregards children's human rights". Nature. 428 (6984): 695. Bibcode:2004Natur.428Q.695B. doi:10.1038/428695a. PMID 15085107.
- Carpenter, Morgan (May 2016). "The human rights of intersex people: addressing harmful practices and rhetoric of change". Reproductive Health Matters. 24 (47): 74–84. doi:10.1016/j.rhm.2016.06.003. ISSN 0968-8080. PMID 27578341.
- Jones, Tiffany (11 March 2016). "The needs of students with intersex variations". Sex Education. 16 (6): 602–618. doi:10.1080/14681811.2016.1149808. ISSN 1468-1811. S2CID 74173324.
- Jones, Tiffany; Hart, Bonnie; Carpenter, Morgan; Ansara, Gavi; Leonard, William; Lucke, Jayne (February 2016). Intersex: Stories and Statistics from Australia (PDF). Cambridge, UK: Open Book Publishers. ISBN 978-1-78374-208-0. Archived from the original (PDF) on 14 September 2016.
- Wilson, Gina (2013). "Equal Rights for Intersex People: Testimony of an Intersex Person". Equal Rights Review. 10: 133–139. Archived from the original on 11 June 2013.
