= Dan Christian Ghattas =

Intersex activist

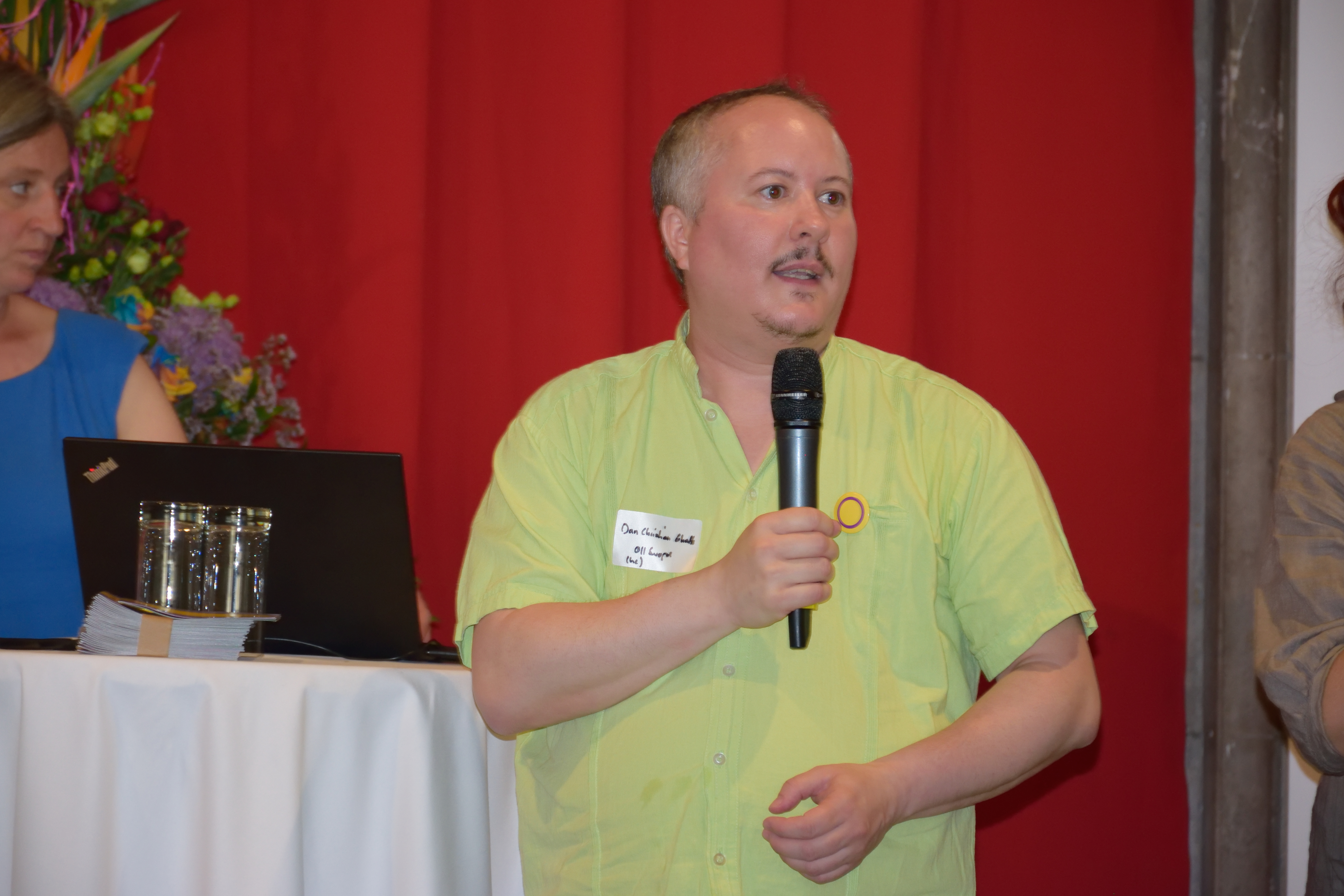
- Occupations: Intersex activist; Author
- Website: oiieurope.org

Dan Christian Ghattas is an intersex activist, university lecturer and author who co-founded OII Europe in 2012 and is now executive director. In 2013, he authored Human Rights between the Sexes, a first comparative international analysis of the human rights situation of intersex people.

== Career ==
In 2018, Ghattas was appointed as the first executive director of OII Europe. He is formerly a university lecturer and cultural scientist. He has a PhD in medieval culture.

== Activism ==
Ghattas started working on intersex human rights in 2009. Alongside Miriam van der Have, he became a co-chair of OII Europe, and later executive director, speaking at events across Europe including the launch of a Council of Europe issue paper on "Human rights and intersex people" in Montenegro. He has provided expertise to a range of institutions, including the Maltese government, the Parliament of the European Union, the UN Office of the High Commissioner for Human Rights and the Committee on the Rights of Persons with Disabilities.

Ghattas has participated in all four International Intersex Forums, and helped to initiate the first forum. In 2015, Ghattas joined an international advisory board for a first philanthropic Intersex Human Rights Fund established by the Astraea Lesbian Foundation for Justice. Ghattas is also a bridge builder advisor to the Disability Rights Fund.

== Works ==
Ghattas has written or co-edited multiple books. He authored Human Rights between the Sexes or Menschenrechte zwischen den Geschlechtern, published in English and German in 2013 by the Heinrich Böll Foundation. The report is believed to be the first comparative international analysis of the human rights of intersex people; it found that intersex people are discriminated against worldwide. Earlier, in 2012, he co-authored a first study into the lives of trans people in Germany, entitled Studie zur Lebenssituation von Transsexuellen in Nordrhein-Westfalen.

== Selected bibliography ==
=== Books and book chapters ===
- Ghattas, Dan Christian (September 2018). "Standing Up for the Human Rights of Intersex People". In Jens Scherpe; Anatol Dutta; Tobias Helms (eds.). The Legal Status of Intersex Persons. Cambridge, England: Intersentia. pp. 429–444. Archived from the original on 2021-10-18.
- Ghattas, Dan Christian; ILGA-Europe; OII Europe (2015). "Standing up for the human rights of intersex people" (PDF).
- Ghattas, Dan Christian, Heinrich-Böll-Stfitung, Unmüßig, Barbara, Mittag, Jana (2013). Human Rights between the Sexes A preliminary study on the life situations of inter*individuals (PDF). Berlin: Heinrich-Böll-Stift. ISBN 978-3-86928-107-0.
- Barth, Elisa; Böttger, Ben; Ghattas, Dan Christian; Schneider, Ina (July 2013). Inter Erfahrungen intergeschlechtlicher Menschen in der Welt der zwei Geschlechter. NoNo-Verlag. ISBN 978-3-942471-03-9. Archived from the original on 2018-07-18.
- Fuchs, Wiebke; Ghattas, Dan Christian; Reinart, Deborah; Widmann, Charlotte (March 2012). Studie zur Lebenssituation von Transsexuellen in Nordrhein-Westfalen (PDF). Cologne.

=== Editorials ===
- Agius, Silvan; Carpenter, Morgan; Ghattas, Dan Christian (August 22, 2014). "Third Gender: A Step Towards Ending Intersex Discrimination". Der Spiegel.

== See also ==
- OII Europe
- Human Rights between the Sexes
