= Intersex rights in Mexico =

Overview of intersex people's rights in Mexico

- Mexico
- Protection of physical integrity and bodily autonomy: No
- Protection from discrimination: No
- Rights by country: Argentina; Australia; Canada; Chile; China; Colombia; France; Germany; Kenya; Malta; Mexico; Nepal; New Zealand; South Africa; Spain; Switzerland; Taiwan; Uganda; United Kingdom; United States

In Mexico there are no explicit rights reserved to intersex persons, no protections from non-consensual cosmetic medical interventions on intersex children and no legislative protection from discrimination. Intersex persons may have difficulties in obtaining necessary health care.

== History ==
In April 2018, Latin American and Caribbean intersex activists published the San José de Costa Rica statement, defining local demands.

== Physical integrity and bodily autonomy ==
Legal prohibition of non-consensual medical interventions Regulatory suspension of non-consensual medical interventions

The intersex civil society organization Brújula Intersexual calls for self-determination by intersex people. It documents the health and human rights situation facing intersex people in Mexico, and in the Latin American region more broadly, including societal taboos, incomprehension, unnecessary medicalization, and discrimination. Ricardo Baruch, writing in Animal Politico and citing Laura Inter, describes the situation on where intersex is constantly left out of discussion or policy because it is not very understood, even though it is a biological situation.

In March 2017, a representative of Brújula Intersexual, testified before the Inter-American Commission on Human Rights on the human rights situation facing intersex people in Latin America.

In July 2018, the UN Committee on the Elimination of Discrimination against Women issued concluding observations on harmful practices, recommending that Mexico "explicitly prohibiting the performance of unnecessary surgical or other medical treatment on intersex children" until they can consent. The committee also called for the provision of counselling and support to families.

== Protection from discrimination ==
Explicit protection from discrimination on grounds of sex characteristics Explicit protection on grounds of intersex status Explicit protection on grounds of intersex within attribute of sex

Brújula Intersexual has found that few doctors are trained and sensitized on intersex issues, leading to a tendency to recommend genital surgeries or hormonal treatments to create "normality" even where individuals have escaped such intersex medical interventions as children. It has documented problems with medical examinations and treatments as a result of such practices. Brújula Intersexual has also documented significant levels of poverty and disparities in access to health care based upon family wealth and income.

== Identification documents ==
Laura Inter of Brújula Intersexual and Eva Alcántara of UAM Xochimilco have cited arguments that the most pressing problems facing intersex people are treatment to enforce a sex binary, and not the existence of the sex binary itself. Laura Inter has imagined a society where sex or gender classifications are removed from birth certificates and other official identification documents, and Brújula Intersexual has called for a right to legal documentation with no obligation to state any gender, in a submission to a review of the Yogyakarta Principles.

== See also ==
- Intersex human rights
- Brújula Intersexual

== Bibliography ==
- Comisión Interamericana de Derechos Humanos (Inter-American Commission on Human Rights ) (November 2015), Violencia contra Personas Lesbianas, Gays, Bisexuales, Trans e Intersex en América (PDF)
- Alcántara, Eva; Inter, Laura (March 2015). "Intersexualidad y derechos humanos" (PDF). Dfensor. Inter-American Court of Human Rights: 28–32.
- Inter, Laura (2015). "Finding My Compass". Narrative Inquiry in Bioethics. 5 (2): 95–98. doi:10.1353/nib.2015.0039. PMID 26300133. S2CID 20101103.
- Cabral, Mauro, ed. (February 2009). Interdicciones: Escrituras de la intersexualidad en castellano. Córdoba, Argentina: Mulabi. ISBN 978-987-05-5898-9.
