= Miriam van der Have =

Dutch intersex activist

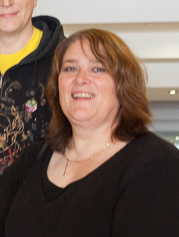
- Known for: Intersex human rights activist, co-chair of OII Europe and managing director NNID
- Website: nnid.nl and oiieurope.org

Miriam van der Have is an intersex human rights activist and woman with androgen insensitivity syndrome. She is a co-founder and co-chair of OII Europe e.V in 2015, co-founder and managing director of NNID Foundation in the Netherlands and member of the ILGA board (International Lesbian, Gay, Bisexual, Trans and Intersex Association) where she is Intersex Secretariat until spring 2019. Van der Have is also a documentary film maker and journalist.

== Early life and career ==
Diagnosed with androgen insensitivity syndrome, and subjected to surgical intervention, van der Have is an intersex human rights advocate and documentary film maker. She has previously worked as a publisher and journalist. Her documentary work includes a film on four intersex women entitled "Vrouwen met AOS" ("Women with AIS"). The documentary premiered on June 15, 2016.

== Activism ==
A former chair of Dutch androgen insensitivity syndrome group AISNederland, van der Have is a founder of NNID Foundation and a co-founder of OII Europe. She "came out" as intersex on a television show in 2003. She speaks and writes widely on intersex issues, promoting the emancipation of intersex people. On Intersex Awareness Day, October 26, 2016, van der Have and Juul van Hoof presented guidance on intersex issues to Minister Jet Bussemaker.

van der Have has stated that, "Intersex variations are not an abnormality or disease. For me intersex refers to the lived experience of the socio-cultural consequences of being born with a body that does not fit within the normative definitions of "man" and "woman." In short, it is about our experiences and not a medical diagnosis." She has called for inclusion of the term "sex characteristics" in Dutch equal treatment legislation.

In December 2016, van der Have was for ILGA elected as the Intersex Secretariat of the International Lesbian, Gay, Bisexual, Trans and Intersex Association, representing NNID.

== Selected bibliography ==
- "Voeg een I toe aan LHBT: intersekse uit de onzichtbaarheid". Het Parool. August 1, 2014.
- Have, M. J. van der; Intven, I. C. a. H.; Barends, A. (June 2008). "Patiënten, ouders, behandelaars en de patiëntenorganisatie". Tijdschrift voor Kindergeneeskunde. 76 (3): 145–147. doi:10.1007/BF03078194. ISSN 0376-7442. S2CID 76377341.

== See also ==
- OII Europe
- International Lesbian, Gay, Bisexual, Trans and Intersex Association
- Intersex human rights
