= Intersex rights in Nepal =

- Nepal
- Protection of physical integrity and bodily autonomy: No
- Protection from discrimination: Unclear
- Rights by country: Argentina; Australia; Canada; Chile; China; Colombia; France; Germany; Kenya; Malta; Mexico; Nepal; New Zealand; South Africa; Spain; Switzerland; Taiwan; Uganda; United Kingdom; United States

In 2015, Nepal introduced constitutional recognition for "gender and sexual minorities". Despite this, the rights situation of intersex people in Nepal is unclear. Local activists have identified human rights violations, including significant gaps in protection of rights to physical integrity and bodily autonomy, and protection from discrimination. A first national meeting of intersex people look place in early 2016, Organised by First openly Intersex Rights Activist Esan Regmi in Nepal. with support from the UNDP.

== Terminology ==
Intersex people are termed as 'antarlingi' अन्तरलिङ्गी in Nepali language.

== History ==
The Blue Diamond Society, established in 2001, in Nepal politically has pursued political and social rights. On December 21, 2007, the Supreme Court ruled that a new democratic government must create laws to protect LGBTI rights and change existing laws that were tantamount to discrimination. In September 2015, several articles mentioning the rights of gender and sexual minorities in the country's new constitution were approved by Parliament after lengthy deliberation. Amongst these:

- Article 12 states that people have the right to have citizenship identification that reflects their preferred gender.
- Article 18 covers rights to equality and states that the State will not "discriminate [against] any citizens based on origin, religion, race, caste, tribe, gender, language or ideological conviction or any other status."
- Article 18 also lists "minorities, marginalized, youth, children, senior citizens, gender and sexual minorities, handicapped persons" asdisadvantaged groups that are recognized by the constitution.

The constitution went into effect on 20 September 2015. These changes mean that Nepal is likely the most progressive country in South Asia, for LGBT rights. Nevertheless, numerous difficulties are reported by intersex people in Nepal, including the right to change gender assignment, the right to bodily autonomy, and the right to health.

In February 2018, Asian intersex activists published the Statement of Intersex Asia and the Asian Intersex Forum, setting out local demands.

Intersex issues in Nepal may often be thought to be third sex issues, and the most well-known third-gender group in South Asia is perhaps the hijra. Serena Nanda writes that: "There is a widespread belief in India that hijras are born hermaphrodites [intersex] and are taken away by the hijra community at birth or in childhood, but I found no evidence to support this belief among the hijras I met, all of whom joined the community voluntarily, often in their teens." This belief has an impact when infants are born. Warne and Raza argue that an association between intersex and hijra people is mostly unfounded but provokes parental fear about the possible future life of their child.

== Physical integrity and bodily autonomy ==
Legal prohibition of non-consensual medical interventions Regulatory suspension of non-consensual medical interventions

Intersex persons are not protected from violations to physical integrity and bodily autonomy. A 2016 book of personal stories by intersex people from Nepal identifies a range of bodily autonomy and health issues, including "Intersex genital mutilation as a growing practice and lack of information and access to reproductive health information or care" and "Lack of access to necessary health care for those experiencing health difficulties as a result of their intersex variation".

In June 2016, the United Nations Committee on the Rights of the Child questioned the Nepalese government, and identified concerns about:

(a) The lack of awareness of issues related to intersex children in Nepal and the high levels of stigma and discrimination faced by intersex children; (b) The challenges faced by intersex children to access identity documents that correspond with the sex/gender identity of their choosing; and, (c) Cases of medically unnecessary surgeries and other procedures on intersex children before they are able to provide their informed consent, which often entail irreversible consequences and can cause severe physical and psychological suffering, and the lack of redress and compensation in such cases.

The Committee called for investigations of human rights violations, education of medical professionals, and access to redress.

== Protection from discrimination ==
Explicit protection from discrimination on grounds of sex characteristics Explicit protection on grounds of intersex status Explicit protection on grounds of intersex within attribute of sex

While the 2015 constitution provides protection for sexual and gender minorities, disabled people, and minorities more generally, Esan Regmi has identified a number of issues facing intersex people in Nepal, including discrimination, and a lack of intersex-specific research and actions within Nepal's LGBTI movement. Access to marriage and inheritance rights are also concerns.

== Identification documents ==
According to local intersex activists, intersex people are not able to change name or gender marker on Nepalese birth certificates, and also have difficulties in updating academic transcripts and citizenship certificates. Intersex people are often confused as 'third gender' which creates barrier in recognition.

On 26 October 2020 the intersex community of Nepal laid seven bullet demands on gender recognition as follows:-

- Ensure intersex infants' right to birth certificate, as an infant be marked as 'intersex' and later on as male, female or non-binary based on their gender identity.
- Ensure intersex people's right to change name and gender marker.
- Ensure self-determination.
- Ensure use of correct gendered terms.
- Ensure right to privacy on one's intersex status, medical records and personal gender history.
- Ensure dignity, bodily integrity & autonomy.
- Remove obligatory 'other gender' or 'third gender' marking to intersex people

== Rights advocacy ==
On February 8–9, 2016, and with the support of the UNDP and other organizations, the Blue Diamond Society hosted a first national meeting on intersex issues. The meeting was led by Esan Regmi, with 13 participants from around Nepal.

=== Organizations ===
The first Intersex Rights organization and the only one till date of Nepal is Campaign for Change.

== See also ==
- Intersex human rights
- Blue Diamond Society
- LGBT rights in Nepal
- Hijra (South Asia)
- Human rights in Nepal

== Bibliography ==
- Regmi, Esan (2016). Stories of Intersex People from Nepal (PDF). Kathmandu.
- Asia Pacific Forum of National Human Rights Institutions (June 2016). Promoting and Protecting Human Rights in relation to Sexual Orientation, Gender Identity and Sex Characteristics. ISBN 978-0-9942513-7-4. Archived from the original on 2017-01-15.
