= OII Europe =

Intersex human rights organisation

OII Europe (Organisation Intersex International Europe)
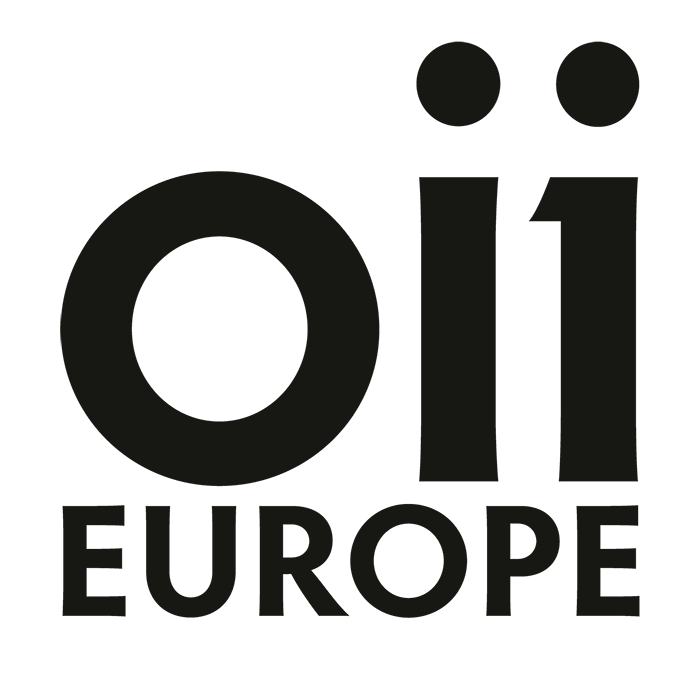
- Abbreviation: OII Europe
- Formation: 10 December 2012
- Type: NGO
- Purpose: Intersex human rights
- Location: Berlin, Germany
- Region served: Europe
- Co-chairs: Kitty Anderson and Miriam van der Have
- Executive Director: Dan Christian Ghattas
- Affiliations: Organisation Intersex International
- Website: oiieurope.org

OII Europe (Organisation Intersex International Europe) is the umbrella organisation of European human rights-based intersex organisations. It is a non-governmental organization (NGO) which is working for the protection and full implementation of intersex people's human rights in Europe.

== History ==
OII Europe was founded on Human Rights Day (10 December) during the Second Intersex Forum in Stockholm in 2012 as a network of national intersex NGOs and intersex activists. The network started immediately to provide trainings and information for policy-makers, NGOs and the general public and to offer expertise on intersex human rights violations to EU and UN institutions and about the living situation of intersex people and the human rights violations they face.

Three years later, in 2015, OII Europe was registered as a non-profit NGO based in Germany. The same year, the organisation, together with other intersex organisations all over the world was given its first funding through the Astraea Intersex Human Rights Fund.

In 2019 OII Europe published the organisation's first Strategic Plan for the years 2019–2022.

== Current work ==
OII Europe works on the grounds of the Malta Declaration, formulated at the 3rd International Intersex Forum 2013. The organisation advocates for intersex rights, fosters and conducts research on the issues faced by intersex people, supports national-level intersex movements and collaborates internationally. OII-Europe has more than 20 member organisations, including almost all existing intersex-led organisations across Europe. It also works with individuals and emerging initiatives in Europe, and Central Asia.

Key goals of the organisation include the full implementation of human rights, bodily integrity & self-determination for intersex people, legal prohibition of non-consensual medical & psychological treatment, promotion of self-awareness, visibility and recognition of intersex people, full protection against discrimination & the adoption of "sex characteristics" as a protective ground and education of society on intersex issues from a human rights perspective.

OII Europe advocates and works with EU Institutions, the Council of Europe and national governments to achieve these goals. The organisation has also published several important toolkits and documents that introduce intersex issues to allies and law and policy-makers, as well as a toolkit for parents of intersex children. Many of the publications are available in several European languages. The organisation also provides two regularly updated resource lists with links to important intersex human rights documents.

Another area of the organisation's work building the European intersex movement, with the OII Europe Community Event & Conference being one of the organisation's key measures to foster the growth and visibility of the European intersex movement.

== OII Europe Community Event and Conference ==
Since 2017 OII Europe has facilitated an annual community event & conference for intersex people and their families. The event offers capacity building, e.g. advocacy, well-being, media work and space for exchange. The conference is public and aims to support awareness raising on intersex in the host country. The event and conference are organised together with a local host

1. Vienna, 30.-31.3.2017 (local host: VIMÖ), 28 intersex people from 16 Council of Europe member states; the participants authored the Vienna Statement.
2. Copenhagen, 8.-10.2.2018 (local host: Intersex Danmark, Copenhagen Pride), 50 participants, from 25 different countries representing all Council of Europe regions; the participants the My Intersex Story video
3. Zagreb, 25.-29.9.20219 (local host: TransAid)

== OII Europe Good Practice Map ==
OII Europe launched the first of its Good Practice Map on May 13, 2019, at the IDAHOT+ Forum in Oslo. The map is a compilation of good practice examples from selected European countries, including examples for missed opportunities and rights under attack for intersex people.

== Websites ==
The organisation has two websites: oiieurope.org and intervisibility.eu. The organisation's main website, oiieurope.org, provides news, resources like the organisation's toolkits and other video and text resources. intervisibility.eu is set up as a community website where intersex people from all across the Council of Europe region can find low-threshold information on who intersex people are, the experiences they face and what OII Europe is. The website also features contribution of intersex people and activists from across Europe on the respective language sub-sites of the website.

== Publications ==
- Standing up for the human rights of intersex people – how can you help?: Published in 2016 in cooperation with ILGA-Europe, the toolkit answers questions about what is it like to be intersex in Europe today, and how allies can help the intersex movement in its advocacy work. The toolkit is available in several European languages.
- Protecting Intersex People in Europe: A toolkit for law and policy makers. With digital appendix and checklist: Published in 2019, this toolkit addresses law and policymakers. It describes the areas of life in which intersex people are most vulnerable to violations on the basis of their sex characteristics and provides detailed guidance on what to do to minimise or eliminate these violations.
- Supporting your intersex child: Published in 2018 in cooperation with IGLYO and EPA, the toolkit addresses parents of intersex children and gives suggestions on how to best support an intersex child.
- #MyIntersexStory – Personal accounts by intersex people living in Europe: The book includes fifteen testimonies by intersex people and their families with illustrations by Ins A Kromminga as well as a text by intersex scholar and sociology professor Janik Bastien Charlebois "On our own terms and in our own words": The value of first-person accounts of intersex experience. The brochure was launched on November 8, 2019, International Intersex Solidarity Day.

In addition to these resources, the organisation also provides a flyer in more than 10 languages, and two extensive resource lists with links to UN country recommendations on intersex and other intersex related human rights documents.

== See also ==
- Intersex human rights
- Intersex rights by country
