= Human Rights between the Sexes =

2013 book by Dan Christian Ghattas

- Author: Dan Christian Ghattas
- Cover artist: Ins A Kromminga
- Language: English; German
- Genre: Human rights; Bioethics
- Publisher: Heinrich Böll Foundation
- Publication date: 18 October 2013
- Publication place: Germany
- Media type: Print (paperback); PDF
- Pages: 68
- ISBN: 978-3-86928-115-5

Human Rights between the Sexes is an analysis of the human rights of intersex people in 12 countries. It was written by Dan Christian Ghattas of the Internationalen Vereinigung Intergeschlechtlicher Menschen (the Organisation Intersex International (OII) in Germany) and published in October 2013 by the Heinrich Böll Foundation. The countries studied were Australia, Belgium, France, Germany, New Zealand, Serbia, South Africa, Taiwan, Turkey, Uganda, Ukraine and Uruguay.

== Synopsis ==
The report is believed to be the first comparative international analysis of the human rights of intersex people. It found that intersex people are discriminated against worldwide.

Ghattas states:

Intersex individuals are considered individuals with a "disorder" in all areas in which Western medicine prevails. They are more or less obviously treated as sick or "abnormal", depending on the respective society.

Ghattas found that:

- Genital "normalization" surgeries are widespread: "Nearly all over the world, intersex bodies are considered to be barely, or not at all, capable of being integrated into the social order. Therefore, genital surgery is performed from infancy to adolescence and adulthood in all examined countries."
- Gonadal tissue is removed in most countries between childhood and adolescence. Hormone treatments are administered.
- There is minimal aftercare.
- Birth registrations, with a sex assignment, are required in most countries within four weeks of birth.
- Intersex is treated as a taboo subject in all countries studied. Intersex people experience prejudice, often due to gender non-conforming behaviour and appearance.
- Human rights-based activism is only recently established, and the number of NGOs small and volunteer-based.

Nearly all over the world, intersex bodies are considered to be barely, or not at all, capable of being integrated into the social order.

Ghattas makes five conclusions for human rights organisations:

1. Raise awareness of the existence of intersex individuals.
2. Increase visibility of intersex individuals and life situations.
3. Encourage intersex people to self-organise and voice needs.
4. Promote collaboration with NGOs.
5. Take account of the needs of intersex people in all areas of human rights work.

The book is published in German as Menschenrechte zwischen den Geschlechtern.

The book can be downloaded for free in either English or German.

== See also ==
- Dan Christian Ghattas
- Intersex
- Intersex human rights
