= LGBTQ movements in the United States =

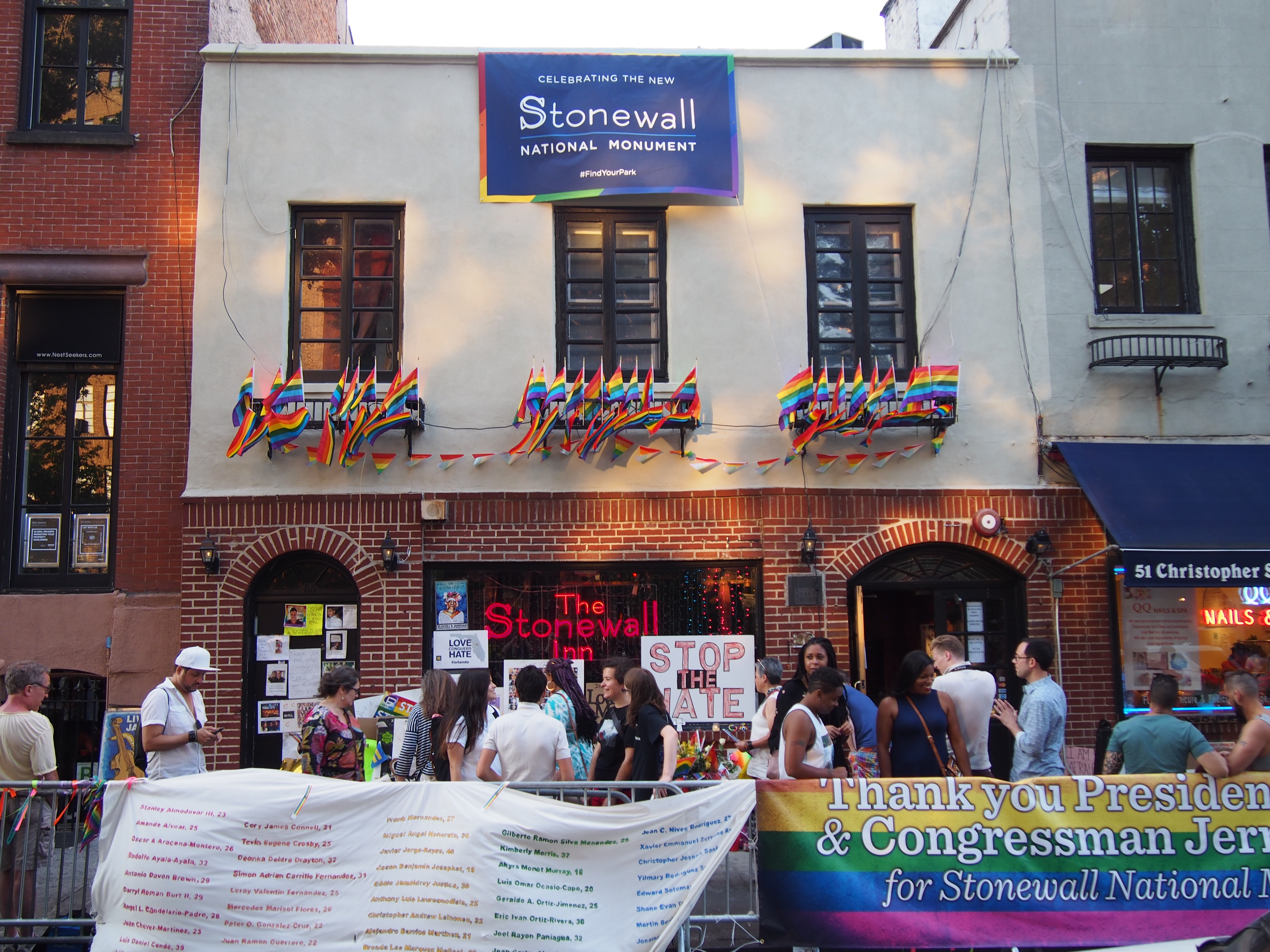
The Stonewall Inn in the gay village of Greenwich Village, Manhattan, site of the June 1969 Stonewall riots, a landmark event in the struggle for LGBT rights in the United States, which opened the door for the advancement of LGBT movements worldwide.

LGBTQ movements in the United States comprise an interwoven history of lesbian, gay, bisexual, transgender and queer social movements in the United States, beginning in the early 20th century. A commonly stated goal among these movements is social equality for LGBTQ people. Some have also focused on building LGBTQ communities or worked towards liberation for the broader society from biphobia, homophobia, and transphobia. LGBTQ movements organized today are made up of a wide range of political activism and cultural activity, including lobbying, street marches, social groups, media, art, and research. Sociologist Mary Bernstein writes:

For the lesbian and gay movement, then, cultural goals include (but are not limited to) challenging dominant constructions of masculinity and femininity, homophobia, and the primacy of the gendered heterosexual nuclear family (heteronormativity). Political goals include changing laws and policies in order to gain new rights, benefits, and protections from harm.

Bernstein emphasizes that activists seek both types of goals in both the civil and political spheres. As with other social movements there is also conflict within and between LGBTQ movements, especially about strategies for change and debates over exactly who comprises the constituency that these movements represent. There is debate over to what extent lesbian, gay, bisexual, transgender, and intersex people share common interests and a need to work together. Leaders of the lesbian and gay movement of the 1970s, 80s and 90s often attempted to hide masculine lesbians, feminine gay men, transgender people, and bisexuals from the public eye, creating internal divisions within LGBT communities.

LGBTQ movements have often adopted a kind of identity politics that sees gay, bisexual and/or transgender people as a fixed class of people; a minority group or groups. Those using this approach aspire to liberal political goals of freedom and equal opportunity, and aim to join the political mainstream on the same level as other groups in society. In arguing that sexual orientation and gender identity are innate and cannot be consciously changed, conversion therapy is generally opposed by the LGBT community. Such attempts are often based in religious beliefs that perceive gay, lesbian and bisexual activity as immoral.

However, others within LGBTQ movements have criticized identity politics as limited and flawed. Elements of the queer movement have argued that the categories of gay and lesbian are restrictive, and attempted to deconstruct those categories, which are seen to "reinforce rather than challenge a cultural system that will always mark the nonheterosexual as inferior".

== Origin ==
It is disputed when the LGBTQ rights movement began in the United States. The earliest date often claimed is that of 1924 in Chicago, with the founding of the Society for Human Rights.

However, it is also argued that the movement in the United States, after years of being highly controlled and hidden, successfully began in the 1940s in Los Angeles. One of the initial organizations was the Mattachine Society. A secretive society which later began to be associated with Communist values, the society became involved in politics and made its first appearance by supporting Henry A. Wallace and the Progressive Party during the presidential election of 1948. The Mattachine Society was led by Harry Hay and began to slowly gain national attention and membership. Some historians also mark the beginning of the movement as a 1965 gay march held in front of Independence Hall in Philadelphia to protest the dismissal of homosexual federal employees.

An even later occurrence that is also said to have been the beginning of the movement for Gay Rights was the Stonewall Riots. On June 27, 1969 New York's Stonewall Inn bar was raided by police. Though this was a regular incident in gay bars like Stonewall, the reaction of its patrons, as they refused to leave and clashed with the raiding police officers, ultimately led to street riots. This event gave way to mass media attention on the issues facing the LGBT community and therefore increased public awareness, making it possible to have an influential movement. Some offer a less specific time for the beginning of the movement and argue that it was during the wake of World War II that the movement to protect gay and lesbian civil rights emerged. Men and women who participated in the military's homosexual world began to realize that it was a part of their identity. As they moved back to the cities they began to live their new lifestyle openly and in great numbers only to be severely oppressed by the police and the government.

Though there is much disagreement as to the beginning of the movement, there are clearly defined phases throughout the movement for gay rights in the U.S. The first phase of the movement being the homophile phase, which mainly consisted of the activities of the Mattachine Society, ONE, Inc., and the Daughters of Bilitis. The homophile movement, which stressed love as opposed to sexuality, focused on protesting political systems for social acceptability. Demonstrations held by homophile organizations were orderly and polite, but had little impact as they were ignored by the media. In 1969, the second phase of the movement, gay liberation, began. During this phase, the number of homophile organizations increased rapidly, as many of the LGBT community became inspired by the various cultural movements occurring during the time period, such as the anti-Vietnam War movement or the Black Power movement. Activism during this phase encouraged "gay power" and encouraged homosexuals to "come out of the closet", so as to publicly display their pride in who they are. They were also more forceful about resisting anti-homosexuality sanctions than activists from the previous phase, participating in marches, riots, and sit-ins. These groups of the 1970s would later call the previous homophile groups assimilationist for their less vigorous methods. Also during this phase there was an increase in lesbian centered organizations within the movement.

== History ==
=== Homophile Movement ===
==== 1920s ====
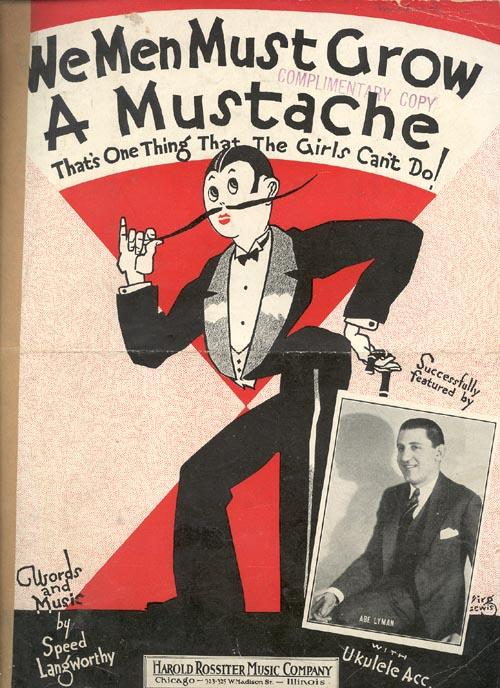
Speed Langworthy's sheet music poking fun at the tendency of women to adopt masculine traits during the 1920s

The 1920s ushered in a new era of social acceptance of minorities and homosexuals, at least in heavily urbanized areas. This was reflected in many of the films (see Pre-Code) of the decade that openly made references to homosexuality. Even popular songs poked fun at the new social acceptance of homosexuality. One of these songs had the title "Masculine Women, Feminine Men". It was released in 1926 and recorded by numerous artists of the day and included the following lyrics:

Masculine women, Feminine men
Which is the rooster, which is the hen?
It's hard to tell 'em apart today! And, say!
Sister is busy learning to shave,
Brother just loves his permanent wave,
It's hard to tell 'em apart today! Hey, hey!
Girls were girls and boys were boys when I was a tot,
Now we don't know who is who, or even what's what!
Knickers and trousers, baggy and wide,
Nobody knows who's walking inside,
Those masculine women and feminine men!

Homosexuals received a level of acceptance that was not seen again until the 1960s. Until the early 1930s, gay clubs were openly operated, commonly known as "pansy clubs". The relative liberalism of the decade is demonstrated by the fact that the actor William Haines, regularly named in newspapers and magazines as the number-one male box-office draw, openly lived in a gay relationship with his lover, Jimmie Shields. Other popular gay actors/actresses of the decade included Alla Nazimova and Ramon Novarro. In 1927, Mae West wrote a play about homosexuality called The Drag, and alluded to the work of Karl Heinrich Ulrichs. It was a box-office success. West regarded talking about sex as a basic human rights issue, and was also an early advocate of gay rights. Emma Goldman also spoke out in defense of gay rights during this time.

==== Society for Human Rights ====
The Society for Human Rights was an American gay-rights organization established in Chicago in 1924. Society founder Henry Gerber was inspired to create it by the work of German doctor Magnus Hirschfeld and the Scientific-Humanitarian Committee and by the organisation Bund für Menschenrecht by Friedrich Radszuweit and Karl Schulz in Berlin. It was the first recognized gay rights organization in the United States, having received a charter from the state of Illinois, and produced the first American publication for homosexuals, Friendship and Freedom.

==== Mattachine Society ====
The Mattachine Society, founded in 1950, was one of the earliest homophile/homosexual organizations in the United States, probably second only to Chicago's Society for Human Rights (1924). Harry Hay and a group of Los Angeles male friends, including Dale Jennings and Rudi Gernreich, formed the group to protect and improve the rights of homosexuals. First formed as the International Bachelors Fraternal Order for Peace and Social Dignity, it later adopted the name The Mattachine Society in reference to the society Mattachine, a French medieval masque group that supposedly traveled broadly using entertainment to point out social injustice. Because of concerns for secrecy and the founders' leftist ideology, they adopted the cell organization being used by the Communist Party of the United States.

The society was forced to endure heavy pressure and public scrutiny during the anti-communist McCarthyism period, due to the communist leanings of some of the Society's members. In a column of the Los Angeles Mirror in March 1953 called it a "strange new pressure group" of "sexual deviants" and "security risks" who were banding together to wield "tremendous political power".

This article generated a dramatic change that in the end, a strong coalition of conservative delegates challenged the societies goals, achievements and instruments. Leadership was demotivated to pursue further activities, the original founders resigned in 1953, and the organization was turned over to the conservative elements who brought in new elements of advocacy and group composition. Some modifications had to be done and advocating took the approach of accommodation rather than mobilizing gay people. They sought the support of the psychiatric profession who they believed held the key to reform. This, however, had a devastating effect as discussion group attendance declined and many local chapters folded. The national structure was dissolved in 1961, with few chapters lasting a few more years. Not only was the structure dissolved in 1961, but Illinois had become the first state to get rid of consensual sexual acts pursued by the same sex within their state laws. Later on throughout the years by 1986, half the states enforced this same law through legislative acts.

==== ONE, Incorporated ====
ONE, Inc. was started by William Dale Jennings joined with his colleagues Don Slater, Dorr Legg, Tony Reyes, and Mattachine Society founder Harry Hay. It formed the public part of the early homophile movement, with a public office, administrative infrastructure, logistics, a telephone, and the first publication that reached the general public. The Los Angeles Postmaster seized and refused to mail copies of ONE Magazine in 1954 on grounds that it was "obscene, lewd, lascivious and filthy".

== LGBTQ movements during the 1970s and 1980s ==
In the 1970s and 1980s these movements were intentionally seeking social change through the combination of different social movement groups such as feminist groups and anti-racism groups.

Along with its continuing growth a part of ONE became the Homosexual Information Center, formed by Don Slater, Billy Glover, Joe and Jane Hansen, Tony Reyes, Jim Schneider, et al.

=== Daughters of Bilitis ===
The Daughters of Bilitis /bɪˈliːtɪs/, also called the DOB or the Daughters, were formed in San Francisco, California in 1955 by four lesbian couples, including Phyllis Lyon and Del Martin. Martin and Lyon also have the distinction of being the first legally married gay couple in the U.S. at the start of the historic San Francisco 2004 same-sex weddings. Their marriage was voided 6 months later by the California Supreme Court. The Daughters of Bilitis (DOB), was the first lesbian civil and political rights organization in the United States. The organization was conceived as a social alternative to lesbian bars, which were subject to raids and police harassment. As the DOB gained members, their focus shifted to providing support to women who were afraid to come out. The DOB followed the model of the homophile movement as developed by the Mattachine Society by encouraging its members to assimilate as much as possible into the prevailing heterosexual culture. The DOB advertised itself as "A Woman's Organization for the purpose of Promoting the Integration of the Homosexual into Society".

By 1959 there were chapters of the DOB in New York City, Los Angeles, Chicago, and Rhode Island along with the original chapter in San Francisco. The group also held conferences every two years from 1960 to 1968. As a national organization, the DOB folded in 1970, although some local chapters still continue. During its fourteen years, DOB became a tool of education for lesbians, gay men, researchers, and mental health professionals.

== New York City police raid and religion within LGBTQ ==
Within a year after that, gay people organized resistance movements that lead to the New York City police raid in 1969. Around the same time frame, biologists were implementing massive studies on the human sexuality within the United States. Each study was found to have "held categories of sexuality and empowered many gay people to fight for social change". Said studies are what arose the new "wave of social activism" and what inspired the resistance operation against discriminatory laws. During the year of 1972, the expansion of allowance for LGBTQ individuals to continue their faith within public churches was growing. Specifically, the acceptance of gays within religious groups and facilities first began within the United Church of Christ, which is what led to other religious facilities following in further actions.

=== Student Homophile Leagues ===
In 1966, Stephen Donaldson founded the Student Homophile League at Columbia University. In 1967, Columbia University officially recognized this group, thus making them the first college in the United States to officially recognize a gay student group. Student Homophile League branches were chartered at Cornell University and New York University in 1968 and at the Massachusetts Institute of Technology in 1969. This led to the formation of two non-affiliated groups, the Homosexuals Intransigent at the City University of New York and FREE (Fight Repression of Erotic Expression) at the University of Minnesota in 1969, now the Queer Student Cultural Center. On the West Coast, a Student Homophile League also was founded at Stanford University, likewise with encouragement from Donaldson, who had announced his hopes for the formation of a Stanford chapter in May 1967 in The New York Times. The Student Homophile League of Stanford University, led by Wendell Anderson (pseudonym), was registered with the Office of the Dean of Students as a recognized voluntary student organization through spring quarter 1968. The organization ceased to exist the following academic year.

=== Transvestia Magazine ===
Louise Lawrence, a male-to-female transgender person who began living full-time as a woman in San Francisco in the 1940s, was a central figure of transgender community. She worked closely with Alfred Kinsey to bring the needs of transgender people to the attention of social scientists and sex reformers. Lawrence collaborated with Virginia Prince, who began cross-dressing in high school, who founded the first peer support and advocacy groups for male cross-dressers in the United States. In 1960, the first issue of Prince's magazine Transvestia was published. Prince acquired the means to fund the publication after assembling a list of 25 acquaintances, each of whom was willing to donate four dollars to her start-up. Working with one hundred dollars, Prince then launched her first issue, published by her own Chevalier Publications, and sold it by subscription and through adult bookstores. Transvestia was published bi-monthly between 1960 and 1980, with a total of 100 issues being created. In 1963, the inside jacket of the magazine stated the publication as "dedicated to the needs of the sexually normal individual who has discovered the existance [sic] of his or her 'other side' and seeks to express it".

=== Gay Liberation Movement ===
==== Gay Liberation Front ====
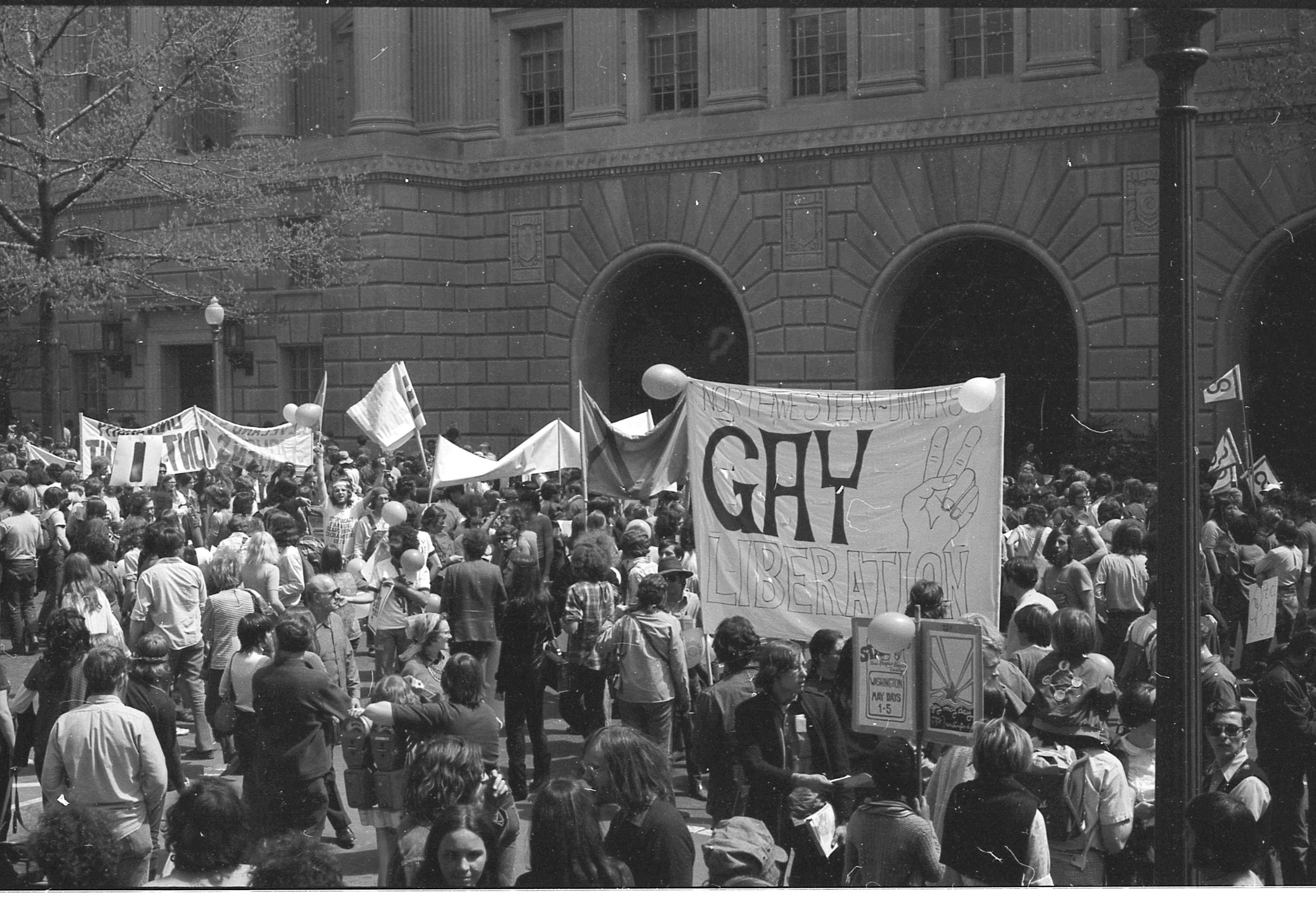
Gay liberation demonstration in Washington D.C.

The GLF advocated for sexual liberation for all people; they believed heterosexuality was a remnant of cultural inhibition and felt that change would not come about unless the current social institutions were dismantled and rebuilt without defined sexual roles. To do this, the GLF was intent on transforming the idea of the biological family and clan and making it more akin to a loose affiliation of members without biological subtexts. Prominent members of the GLF also opposed and addressed other social inequalities between the years of 1969 to 1972 such as militarism, racism, and sexism, but because of internal rivalries the GLF officially ended its operations in 1972. As for liberation, in the year 1975 many within the LGBTQ group were caught up in the legal system and were dealing with cross-dressing laws unconstitutionally.

GLF was shaped in part by the Students for a Democratic Society, a radical student organization of the times. Allen Young, a former SDS activist, was key in framing GLF's principles. He asserted that "the artificial categories of 'heterosexual' and 'homosexual' have been laid on us by a sexist society, as gays, we demand an end to the gender programming which starts when we are born, the family, is the primary means by which this restricted sexuality is created and enforced, Our understanding of sexism is premised on the idea that in a few society everyone will be gay." The GLF's statement of purpose stated, "We are a revolutionary group of men and women formed with the realization that complete sexual liberation for all people cannot come about unless existing social institutions are abolished. We reject society's attempt to impose sexual roles and definitions of our nature."

Members did not limit activism to gay causes. In late 1960s and early 1970s, many homosexuals joined protests with other radical groups such as the Black Panthers, women's liberationists and anti-war activists. Lesbians brought the principles of radical feminism on the emerging new philosophy, and GLF activists argued that the institution of heterosexual families necessitated the oppression of homosexuals, allowing them to define their gayness as a form of political resistance. GLF activist Martha Shelley wrote, "We are women and men who, from the time of our earliest memories, have been in revolt against the sex role structure and nuclear family structure."

==== Gay student organizations ====
Although the pre-Stonewall student Homophile Leagues were most heavily influenced by the Mattachine Society, the post-Stonewall student organizations were more likely to be inspired and named after the more militant GLF. GLF-like campus groups held sponsored social activities, educational programs, and provided support to individual members much like the earlier college groups. However, activists in the GLF-type groups generally were much more visible and more politically oriented than the pre-Stonewall gay student groups. These new activists were often committed to radical social change, and preferred confrontational tactics such as demonstrations, sit-ins, and direct challenges to discriminatory campus policies. This new defiant philosophy and approach was influenced by other militant campus movements such as Black Power, anti-Vietnam war groups, and student free speech movements. Many GLF members were involved with other militant groups such as these, and saw gay rights as part of a larger movement to transform society; their own liberation was fundamentally tied to the liberation of all peoples. Within the year of 1958, LGBTQ students were denied their full freedom of speech rights in terms of not being able to demonstrate parades or gather permits to do so. It was also implemented that "the exclusion of lesbian and gay groups from public fora", would be in place.

Success of the early informal homosexual student groups, along with the inspiration provided by other college-based movements and the Stonewall riots, led to the proliferation of Gay Liberation Fronts on campuses across the country by the early 1970s. These initial LGBT student movements handed out gay rights literature, organized social events, and sponsored lectures about the gay experience. Through their efforts, the campus climate for LGBT people improved. Also, by gaining institutional recognition and establishing a place on campus for LGBT students, the groundwork was laid for the creation of LGBT groups at colleges and universities throughout the country and generation of wider acceptance and tolerance.

==== Bisexual activism ====
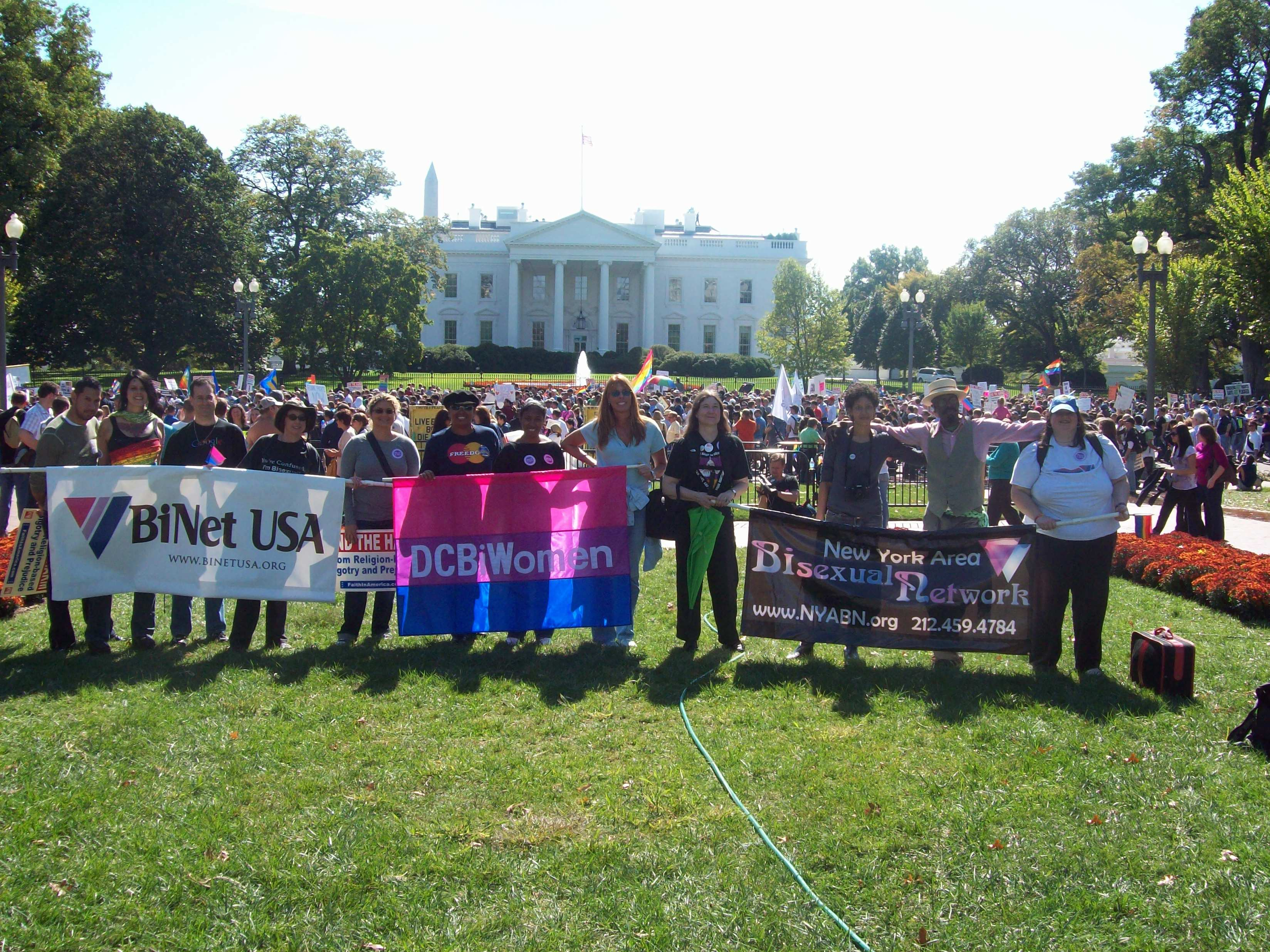
Bisexual activists at the 2009 National Equality March

Bisexuals became more visible in the LGBT rights movement in the 1960s and 1970s. Activism on behalf of bisexuals in particular also began to grow, especially in San Francisco. One of the earliest organizations for bisexuals, the Sexual Freedom League in San Francisco, was facilitated by Margo Rila and Frank Esposito beginning in 1967. Two years later, during a staff meeting at a San Francisco mental health facility serving LGBT people, nurse Maggi Rubenstein came out as bisexual. Due to this, bisexuals began to be included in the facility's programs for the first time.

In 1972 a Quaker group, the Committee of Friends on Bisexuality, issued the "Ithaca Statement on Bisexuality" supporting bisexuals.

The Statement, which may have been "the first public declaration of the bisexual movement" and "was certainly the first statement on bisexuality issued by an American religious assembly," appeared in the Quaker Friends Journal and The Advocate in 1972.

In that same year the National Bisexual Liberation Group formed in New York. In 1976 the San Francisco Bisexual Center opened.

==== Transgender activism ====
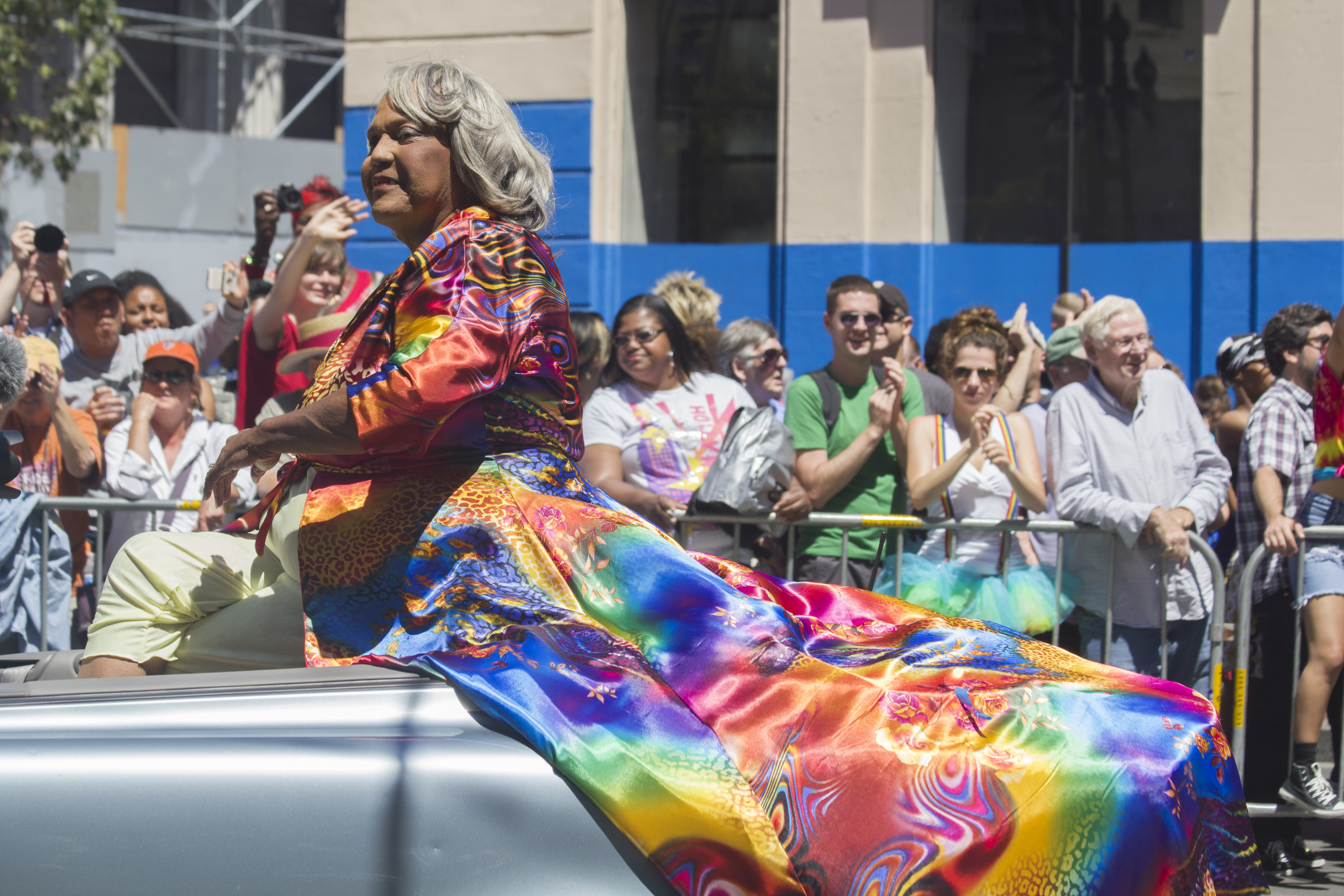
Trans activist Miss Major, a participant in the 1969 Stonewall Riots, in Pride 2014 SF

In the wake of the transgender street prostitutes riot in impoverished Tenderloin neighborhood at a popular all-night restaurant, Gene Compton's Cafeteria, in 1966, San Francisco transsexual activists used the riot's momentum to establish several community-based support services, with the most successful being the National Transsexual Counseling Unit (NTCU), established in 1968. The NTCU is said to be the first peer-run counseling support resource in the world. The NTCU's success was partially due to financial support from the Erickson Education Foundation(EEF), which funded renting an office space and hiring two full time peer counselors. The NTCU served the community until 1974, when reactionary members of the SFPD arrested one of the peer counselors on false drug charges, and attempted to frame Blackstone with drugs planted in his desk. While Blackstone didn't face charges, he was reassigned to a different department, leaving the NTCU staggering along for a short while before the EEF withdrew funding.

==== Gay & Lesbian Advocates & Defenders (GLAD) ====
In 2003, GLAD received national attention for its work in winning marriage rights for same-sex couples in Massachusetts. In Goodridge v. Department of Public Health, it successfully argued before the Massachusetts Supreme Judicial Court that to restrict marriage to heterosexual couples was a violation of the state constitution. In October 2008, GLAD won marriage rights for same-sex couples in Connecticut with a decision of the Supreme Court of Connecticut in Kerrigan v. Commissioner of Public Health.

==== Affirmation: Gay & Lesbian Mormons ====
This is an international organization for gay, lesbian, transgender, bisexual, and intersex people who identify as members or ex-members of the Church of Jesus Christ of Latter-day Saints (LDS Church). Although a core belief is that "homosexuality and homosexual relationships can be consistent with and supported by the Gospel of Jesus Christ", it is not in fact supported by the doctrine in this religion.

Under the name Affirmation: Gay Mormons United, the first Affirmation group was organized in Salt Lake City, Utah on June 11, 1977 by Stephan Zakharias and a group of other Mormon and ex-Mormons Gays and Lesbians. The original group struggled to survive until 1978, when Paul Mortensen formed the Los Angeles chapter and in 1980 the name was changed to Affirmation:Gay & Lesbian Mormons. Through the influence of the Los Angeles chapter, Affirmation groups appeared in many cities around the country.

=== LGBT rights movement ===
==== AIDS activism ====
Militant groups such as ACT UP (AIDS Coalition to Unleash Power) and Queer Nation crafted a media-oriented, direct-action politics that proved congenial to a new generation of transgender activists. The first transgender activist group to embrace the new queer politics was Transgender Nation, founded in 1992 as an offshoot of Queer Nation's San Francisco chapter. Eruption of AIDS crisis urged for another approach. An effective response to the epidemic meant addressing systemic social problems such as poverty and racism that transcended narrow sexual identity politics. Leslie Feinberg's influential pamphlet, Transgender Liberation: A Movement Whose Time Has Come, published in 1992, heralded a new era in transgender politics. Feinberg describes herself as a "white, working class, secular Jewish, transgender lesbian", and personally uses she or ze to describe her/herself. Feinberg's 1993 first novel Stone Butch Blues, won the Lambda Literary Award and the 1994 American Library Association Gay & Lesbian Book Award. The work is not an autobiography. Feinberg has authored two non-fiction books, Trans Liberation: Beyond Pink or Blue and Transgender Warriors: Making History, the novel Drag King Dreams, and Rainbow Solidarity in Defense of Cuba, a compilation of 25 journalistic articles, and has been awarded an honorary doctorate from Starr King School for the Ministry for transgender and social justice work.

==== FTM International ====
In 1986, inspired by FTM pioneers, Lou Sullivan, a crucially important community-based historian of transness, founded the FTM support group that grew into FTM International, the leading advocacy group for female-to-male individuals, and began publishing The FTM Newsletter. Sullivan was also a founding member and board member of the GLBT Historical Society (formerly the Gay and Lesbian Historical Society) in San Francisco. His personal and activist papers are preserved in the institution's archives as collection no. 1991-07; the papers are fully processed and available for use by researchers, and a finding aid is posted on the Online Archive of California. The Historical Society has displayed selected materials from Sullivan's papers in a number of exhibitions, notably "Man-i-fest: FTM Mentoring in San Francisco from 1976 to 2009", which was open through much of 2010 in the second gallery at the society's headquarters at 657 Mission St. in San Francisco, and "Our Vast Queer Past: Celebrating San Francsico's GLBT History", the debut exhibition in the main gallery at the society's GLBT History Museum that opened in January 2011 in San Francisco's Castro District.

In the years since Sullivan's death in 1991, Jamison Green has emerged as the leading FTM activist in the United States. He chairs the board of Gender Education and Advocacy, a non-profit educational organization, and serves on the boards of the Transgender Law and Policy Institute and the World Professional Association for Transgender Health. He is also a board member of the Equality Project and an advisory board member of the National Center for Transgender Equality. He was the leader of FTM International from March 1991 to August 1999 and a member of the Human Rights Campaign Business Council until late 2007, when he resigned over the organization's stance on transgender inclusion in the Employment Non-Discrimination Act.

In 1980, transgender phenomena were officially classified by the American Psychiatric Association as psychopathology, "gender identity disorder".

==== Human Rights Campaign (HRC) ====
It is the largest LGBTQ civil rights advocacy group and political lobbying organization in the United States. According to the HRC, it has more than 1.5 million members and supporters.

HRC is an umbrella group of two separate non-profit organizations and a political action committee: the HRC Foundation, a 501(c)(3) organization that focuses on research, advocacy and education; the Human Rights Campaign, a 501(c)(4) organization that focuses on promoting the social welfare of lesbian, gay, bisexual, and transgender (LGBT) people through lobbying Congress and state and local officials for support of pro-LGBT bills, and mobilizing grassroots action amongst its members; and the HRC Political Action Committee, which supports candidates that adhere to its positions on LGBT rights.

Local activities are carried out by local steering committees, of which there are over 30 located throughout the United States.

==== GLAAD ====
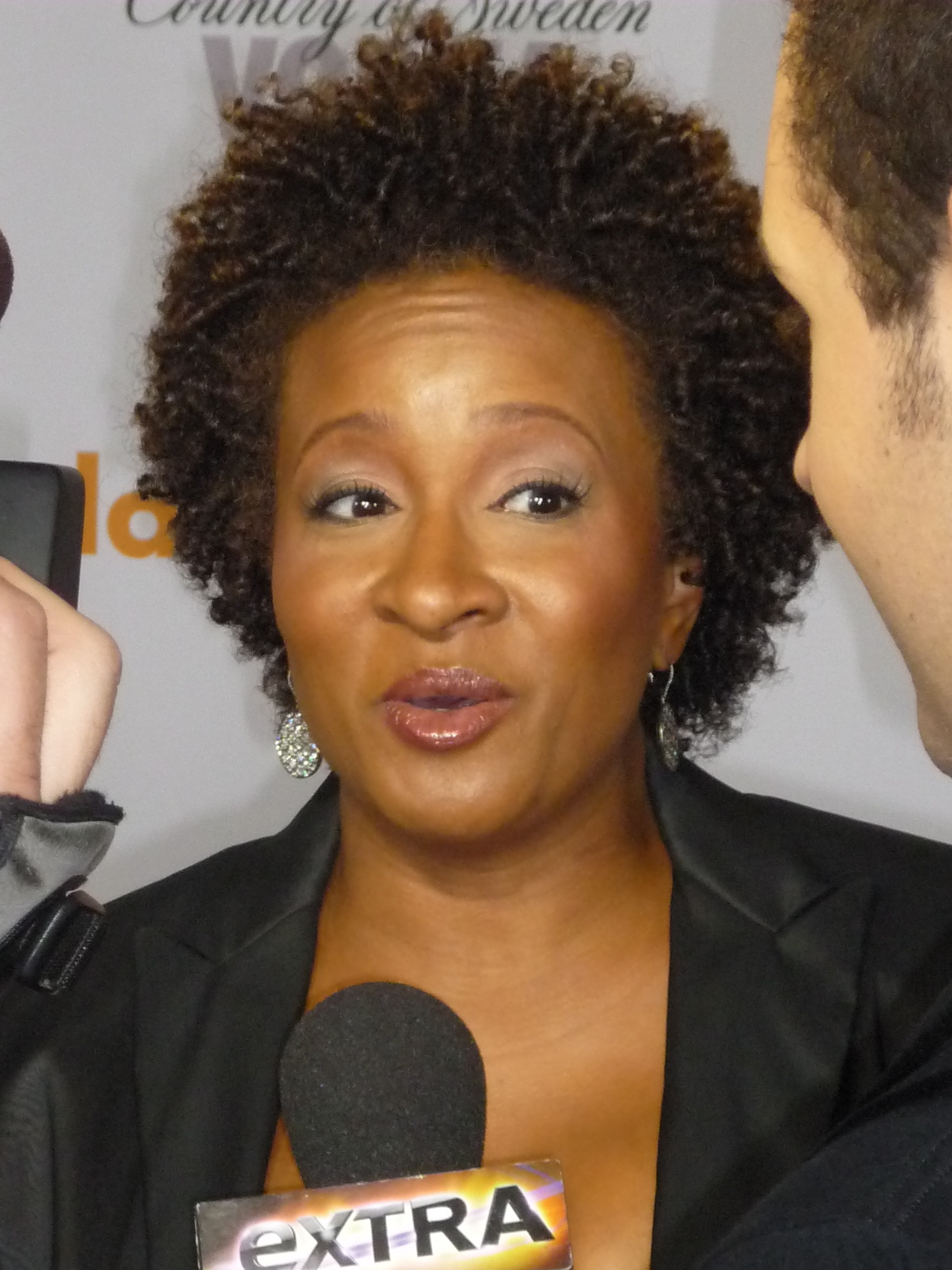
Wanda Sykes 2010 GLAAD Media Awards

GLAAD (formerly the Gay & Lesbian Alliance Against Defamation) is a U.S. non-governmental media monitoring organization that promotes the image of LGBTQ people in the media. Before March 2013, the name "GLAAD" had been an acronym for "Gay & Lesbian Alliance Against Defamation", but became the primary name due to its inclusiveness of bisexual and transgender issues. Its stated mission, in part, is to "[amplify] the voice of the LGBT community by empowering real people to share their stories, holding the media accountable for the words and images they present, and helping grassroots organizations communicate effectively".

Formed in New York City in 1985 to protest against what it saw as the New York Post's defamatory and sensationalized AIDS coverage, GLAAD put pressure on media organizations to end what it saw as homophobic reporting. Initial meetings were held in the homes of several New York City activists as well as after-hours at the New York State Council on the Arts. The founding group included film scholar Vito Russo; Gregory Kolovakos, then on the staff of the NYS Arts Council and who later became the first executive director; Darryl Yates Rist; Allen Barnett.

In 1987, after a meeting with GLAAD, The New York Times changed its editorial policy to use the word gay instead of harsher terms referring to homosexuality.

Entertainment Weekly has named GLAAD as one of Hollywood's most powerful entities, and the Los Angeles Times described GLAAD as "possibly one of the most successful organizations lobbying the media for inclusion".

==== Camp Trans ====
Camp Trans was sparked by a 1991 incident in which Nancy Burkholder was ejected from the Michigan Womyn's Music Festival after another woman asked her whether she was trans and she refused to answer The festival had maintained a "womyn-born-womyn" policy since the late 1970s or early 1980s. Each year afterwards a group of women, both transgender and cisgender, protested the exclusion of trans women from the event. Initially these protests were small and sometimes carried on inside of the camp. A more organized group of trans women and their allies began camping and holding demonstrations outside the gate. After a five-year hiatus, Camp Trans returned in 1999, led by transgender activists Riki Ann Wilchins and Leslie Feinberg, as well as many members of the Boston and Chicago Lesbian Avengers. The events of this year drew attention and controversy, culminating in tensions as a small group of transgender activists were admitted into the festival to exchange dialogue with organizers and to negotiate a short-lived compromise allowing only post-operative trans women on the festival land.

==== Intersex movement ====
Intersex activism between the late 1990s and mid 2000s led from demonstrating outside a national pediatric conference, in an event now commemorated by Intersex Awareness Day to speaking inside clinical conferences, and the first human rights investigation into medical "normalization", by the Human Rights Commission of the City and County of San Francisco. This was followed by a period of retrenchment of medical authority over intersex bodies.

The Intersex Society of North America (ISNA) was a non-profit advocacy group founded in 1993 by Cheryl Chase to end shame and secrecy; they also advocated deferring most genital surgeries on children. Other notable members included Morgan Holmes, Max Beck, Howard Devore and Alice Dreger. The ISNA stated that intersex is a socially constructed label that reflects actual biological variation. They further stated that intersex anatomy is not always present at birth, and may not manifest until the child hits puberty. ISNA closed in June 2008 after supporting the creation of a new clinical term for intersex conditions, Disorders of Sex Development (DSD) albeit ambivalently, as a means of opening "many more doors" and engaging with clinicians.

New organizations such as Intersex Campaign for Equality and interACT were since established with civil and human rights goals. Advocacy continues, including legal action, with the "M.C." legal case, advanced by Interact Advocates for Intersex Youth with the Southern Poverty Law Center still before the courts, international advocacy drawing attention to continuing abuses within the U.S. medical system, and work by Intersex Campaign for Equality and others on recognition of intersex people with non-binary identities. Notable and active U.S. advocates include Georgiann Davis, Pidgeon Pagonis, Sean Saifa Wall, Hida Viloria, and Anne Tamar-Mattis.

==== GenderPAC ====
===== Community disagreements =====
GenderPAC exemplified what certain feminists opposed about queer rights movements and certain elements of gender studies: Sheila Jeffreys wrote that its aims ignored women in favor of "transgenders [sic], most of whom are men, and homosexuality", and that the organization's conception of gender as something that should be protected, and the basis for individuals rights that needed to be respected rather than eliminated, would serve to reinforce discrimination.

Conversely, other transgender rights organizations were angered by GenderPAC's rejection of the label of a transgender organization and to focus on trans issues. These latter criticized GenderPAC's reputed shift of focus away from a trans-inclusive ENDA at the supposed prompting of HRC, their unwillingness to engage with identity categories, and what they saw as a "violation" or exclusion of trans people through the use of their stories to raise money which was not spent primarily on trans issues.

==== Transgender Law Center (TLC) ====
TIC is a San Francisco-based civil rights organization advocating for transgender communities. They are California's first "fully staffed, state-wide transgender legal organization" and were initially a fiscally sponsored project of the National Center for Lesbian Rights.

TLC utilizes direct legal services, public policy advocacy, and educational opportunities to advance the rights and safety of diverse transgender communities.

== Opposition ==
=== Public opposition ===
LGBT movements are opposed by a variety of individuals and organizations. They may have a personal, moral, political or religious objection to gay rights, homosexual relations or gay people. Opponents say same-sex relationships are not marriages, that legalization of same-sex marriage will open the door for the legalization of polygamy, that it is unnatural and that it encourages unhealthy behavior. Some social conservatives believe that all sexual relationships with people other than an opposite-sex spouse undermines the traditional family and that children should be reared in homes with both a father and a mother.

Some people worry that gay rights may conflict with individuals' freedom of speech, religious freedoms in the workplace, and the ability to run churches, charitable organizations and other religious organizations that hold opposing social and cultural views to LGBT rights. There is also concern that religious organizations might be forced to accept and perform same-sex marriages or risk losing their tax-exempt status.

Eric Rofes author of the book, A Radical Rethinking of Sexuality and Schooling: Status Quo or Status Queer?, argues that the inclusion of teachings on homosexuality in public schools will play an important role in transforming public ideas about lesbian and gay individuals. As a former teacher in the public school system, Rofes recounts how he was fired from his teaching position after making the decision to come out as gay. As a result of the stigma that he faced as a gay teacher he emphasizes the necessity of the public to take radical approaches to making significant changes in public attitudes about homosexuality. According to Rofes, radical approaches are grounded in the belief that "something fundamental needs to be transformed for authentic and sweeping changes to occur". The radical approaches proposed by Rofes have been met with strong opposition from anti-gay rights activists such as John Briggs. Former California senator, John Briggs proposed Proposition 6, a ballot initiative that would require that all California state public schools fire any gay or lesbian teachers or counselors, along with any faculty that displayed support for gay rights in an effort to prevent what he believe to be " the corruption of the children's minds". The exclusion of homosexuality from the sexual education curriculum, in addition to the absence of sexual counseling programs in public schools, has resulted in increased feelings of isolation and alienation for gay and lesbian students who desire to have gay counseling programs that will help them come to terms with their sexual orientation.

David Campos, author of the book, Sex, Youth, and Sex Education: A Reference Handbook, illuminates the argument proposed by proponents of sexual education programs in public schools. Many gay rights supporters argue that teachings about the diverse sexual orientations that exist outside of heterosexuality are pertinent to creating students that are well informed about the world around them. However, Campos also acknowledges that the sex education curriculum alone cannot teach youth about factors associated with sexual orientation but instead he suggests that schools implement policies that create safe school learning environments and foster support for gay and lesbian, bisexual, and transgender youth. It is his belief that schools that provide unbiased, factual information about sexual orientation, along with supportive counseling programs for these homosexual youth will transform the way society treats homosexuality. Many opponents of LGBT social movements have attributed their indifference toward homosexuality as being a result of the immoral values that it may instill in children who are exposed to homosexual individuals. In opposition to this claim, many proponents of increased education about homosexuality suggest that educators should refrain from teaching about sexuality in schools entirely. In her book entitled Gay and Lesbian Movement, Margaret Cruikshank provides statistical data from the Harris and Yankelvoich polls which confirmed that over 80% of American adults believe that students should be educated about sexuality within their public school. In addition, the poll also found that 75% of parents believe that homosexuality and abortion should be included in the curriculum as well. An assessment conducted on California public school systems discovered that only 2% of all parents actually disproved of their child being taught about sexuality in school.

It had been suggested that education has a positive impact on support for same sex marriage. African Americans statistically have lower rates of educational achievement, however, the education level of African Americans does not have as much significance on their attitude towards same-sex marriage as it does on white attitudes. Educational attainment among whites has a significant positive effect on support for same-sex marriage, whereas the direct effect of education among African Americans is less significant. The income levels of whites have a direct and positive correlation with support for same-sex marriage, but African American income level is not significantly associated with attitudes toward same-sex marriage.

Location also affects ideas towards same-sex marriage; residents of rural and southern areas are significantly more opposed to same-sex marriage in comparison to residents elsewhere. Women are consistently more supportive than men of LGBT rights, and individuals that are divorced or have never married are also more likely to grant marital rights to same-sex couples than married or widowed individuals. Also, white women are significantly more supportive than white men, but there are no gender discrepancies among African Americans. The year in which one was born is a strong indicator of attitude towards same-sex marriage—generations born after 1946 are considerably more supportive of same-sex marriage than older generations. Statistics show that African Americans are more opposed to same-sex marriage than any other ethnicity.

Religion, as measured by individuals' religious affiliations, behaviors, and beliefs, has a lot of influence in structuring same-sex union attitudes and consistently influences opinions about homosexuality. The most liberal attitudes are generally reflected by Jews, liberal Protestants, and people who are not affiliated with religion. This is because many of their religious traditions have not "systematically condemned homosexual behaviors" in recent years. Moderate and tolerant attitudes are generally reflected by Catholics and moderate Protestants. And lastly, the most conservative views are held by Evangelical Protestants. Moreover, it is a tendency for one to be less tolerant of homosexuality if their social network is strongly tied to a religious congregation. Organized religion, especially Protestant and Baptist affiliations, espouse conservative views which traditionally denounce same-sex unions. Therefore, these congregations are more likely to hear messages of this nature. Polls have also indicated that the amount and level of personal contact that individuals have with homosexual individuals and traditional morality affects attitudes of same-sex marriage and homosexuality.

=== Legal opposition ===
Though gay and lesbians struggled to go public with their efforts in the U.S., they still were met with opposition. Despite participating in very few public activities in the early 19th century, many gays and lesbians were targeted by police who kept list of the bars and restaurants that were known to cater to the population. Many were arrested for sodomy or hospitalized in mental facilities for homosexuality. They were also fired from many jobs for their lifestyles. States had many laws that made homosexuality a crime and the government would often support the states, as in the 1917 Immigration Act which denied homosexuals entry into the country.

== Identity politics ==
The term identity politics and movements linked to it came into being during the latter part of the 20th century. It can most notably be found in class movements, feminist movements, gay and lesbian movements, disability movements, ethnic movements and post colonial movements. Identity politics is open to wide debate and critique.

== US government and LGBTQ rights ==
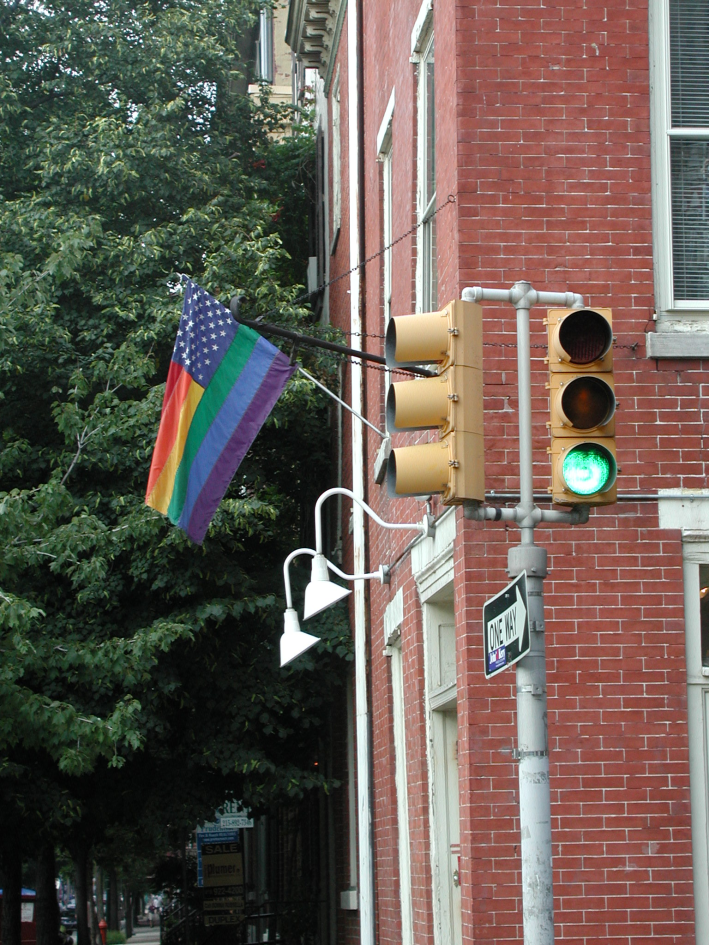
An LGBT American flag in Philadelphia, Pennsylvania

As a federal republic, absent of many federal laws or court decisions, LGBTQ rights often are dealt with at the local or state level. Thus the rights of LGBTQ people in one state may be very different from the rights of LGBTQ people in another state.

- Same-sex couples: On June 26, 2015, the U.S. Supreme Court struck down all state bans on same-sex marriage, legalized it in all fifty states, and required states to honor out-of-state same-sex marriage licenses in the case Obergefell v. Hodges. See also Same sex marriage in the United States.
- Freedom of Speech: Homosexuality as way of expression and life is not as obscene, and thus protected under the First Amendment. However, states can reasonably regulate the time, place and manner of speech. Pornography is protected, when it is not obscene, but it is based on local community standards, which is reasonable and fair.
- Civil rights: Sexual orientation is not a protected class under Federal civil rights law, but it is protected for federal civilian employees and in federal security clearance issues. The United States Supreme Court implied in Romer v. Evans that a state may not prohibit gay people from using the democratic process to get protection, prescribed by anti-discrimination law.
- Education: Public schools and universities generally have to recognize an LGBT student organization, if they recognize other social or political organization, but high school students may be required to get parental consent.
- Hate crimes and criminal law: Federal hate crime law now includes sexual orientation and gender identity. The Matthew Shepard Act, officially the Matthew Shepard and James Byrd Jr. Hate Crimes Prevention Act, which expands the 1969 United States federal hate-crime law to include crimes motivated by a victim's actual or perceived gender, sexual orientation, gender identity, or disability, is an Act of Congress, passed on October 22, 2009, and was signed into law by President Barack Obama on October 28, 2009, as a rider to the National Defense Authorization Act for 2010 (H.R. 2647). As far as criminal law is concerned, homosexual relations between consenting adults in private is not a crime, per Lawrence v. Texas. The age of consent for heterosexuals and homosexuals should be the same, but each state decides what that age shall be. This does not apply to military law, where sodomy is still a felony under the Uniform Code of Military Justice. Although, the Lawrence decision has been cited in some military cases as applying.

=== LGBT rights and the Supreme Court ===
- 1958: One, Inc. v. Olesen rules that a homosexual publication is not automatically obscene and thus protected by the First Amendment.
- 1967: Boutilier v. Immigration and Naturalization Service rules that Congress may exclude immigrants on the grounds that they are homosexual.
- 1971: Supreme Court dismisses Baker v. Nelson, allowing a Minnesota law defining marriage as a union between a man and a woman.
- 1976: Supreme Court refuses to hear Doe v. Commonwealth's Attorney and thus affirms a lower courts ruling that a Virginia state sodomy law is constitutional.
- 1985: Supreme Court is equally divided in a 4–4 decision, and thus affirms a Tenth Circuit Court ruling, National Gay Task Force v. Board of Education, that an Oklahoma law that gave the public school broad authority to fire homosexual teachers was too broad and thus unconstitutional.
- 1986: In Bowers v. Hardwick the Supreme Court rules that sodomy laws are constitutional. The court overturns this ruling in the 2003 case of Lawrence v. Texas.
- 1996: In Romer v. Evans the high court overturns a state constitutional amendment prohibiting elected lawmakers in Colorado from including LGB people in their civil rights laws.
- 1998: Webster v. Doe rules that federal sexual harassment laws do include same-sex sexual harassment.
- 2000: Boy Scouts of America et al. v. Dale rules that the Boy Scouts of America does not have to follow state anti-discrimination laws when it comes to sexual orientation.
- 2003: Lawrence vs. Texas declares state sodomy laws that were used to prosecute homosexuals for having sex in the privacy of their homes unconstitutional.
- 2013: United States v. Windsor declares Section 3 of the Defense of Marriage Act unconstitutional, rendering same-sex marriages performed in jurisdictions where legal recognized by the federal government.
- 2015: Obergefell v. Hodges, in a 5–4 decision, legalized same-sex marriage nationwide, in all 50 states.
- 2020: Bostock v. Clayton County, in a 6–3 decision, held that Title VII of the Civil Rights Act of 1964 protects employees against discrimination because they are gay or transgender.

=== LGBTQ Rights and State Courts ===
- 1961: Illinois is the first state to abolish its sodomy laws.
- 1998: Maine became the first state to repeal its existing gay-rights statutes
- 1999: Vermont Supreme Court grants the same rights and protections that married heterosexuals have to homosexual partners.
- 1999: Sodomy laws of 32 states were repealed
- 1999: 11 states had laws to protect homosexuals from discrimination
- 2000: Vermont Supreme Court backed civil unions between homosexual couples
- 2003: Massachusetts Highest Court rules that homosexuals do have the right to marry according to the constitution.
- 2003: Sodomy Laws in all states were overturned.
- 2006: New Jersey's Supreme Court extends civil rights to homosexuals and allows civil unions
- 2008: California and Connecticut Supreme Courts abolished their states' bans on same-sex marriages
- 2009: Iowa Supreme Court unanimously legalized same-sex marriage in Varnum v. Brien

=== American political parties, interest groups and LGBTQ rights ===
The Libertarian Party supported a libertarian perspective on LGBT rights from its founding in 1971. Its first platform, in 1972, said, "We hold that no action which does not infringe the rights of others can properly be termed a crime. We favor the repeal of all laws creating "crimes without victims" now incorporated in Federal, state and local laws—such as laws on voluntary sexual relations, drug use, gambling, and attempted suicide." In 1976, the party published a pamphlet, Gay Rights: A Libertarian Approach, which called for an end to sodomy laws and other legal discrimination, including with regard to marriage and adoption. The pamphlet also explained that libertarians opposed "legislation forcing private persons who, for one reason or another, dislike homosexuals, nevertheless to hire them, admit them to "public accommodations" (which are not really "public" at all, but privately owned), and rent or sell apartment or houses to them" because "freedom...implies also the freedom to be wrong".

The National Stonewall Democratic Federation is the official LGBT organization for the Democratic Party, while the Log Cabin Republicans is the organization for lesbian, gay and bisexual citizens that want to moderate the Republican Party social policies. In terms of minor political parties, the Outright Libertarians is the official LGBT organization for the Libertarian Party, and is among the groups that follow the Libertarian perspectives on gay rights. The Green Party LGBT members are represented by the Lavender Greens. The Socialist Party USA has a Queer Commission to focus on LGBT rights issues.

In terms of interest groups, the Human Rights Campaign is the largest LGBT organization in the United States, claiming over 725,000 members and supporters, though this membership count is disputed. The HRC endorses federal candidates, and while it is technically bi-partisan and has endorsed some Republican Party, its overall pro-choice, center-left philosophy tends to favor the Democratic Party candidates. The National Gay and Lesbian Taskforce is a progressive LGBT organization that focuses on local, state and federal issues, while the Independent Gay Forum and the Gays and Lesbians for Individual Liberty both subscribe to conservative or libertarian principles. And the Empowering Spirits Foundation not only engages in empowering individuals and organizations to engage in the political process for equality, but engages in service-oriented activities in communities typically opposed to equal rights to help bring about change.

LPAC is a Super PAC founded in 2012 to represent the interests of lesbians in the United States, and to campaign on LGBT and women's rights issues. Its supporters include Billie Jean King, Jane Lynch, Laura Ricketts and Urvashi Vaid. On its first day of operations, LPAC raised $200,000.

=== Global Equality Fund (GEF) ===
It is a program of the Secretary of State's Office of Global Partnerships, launched by U.S. Secretary of State Hillary Clinton in December 2011, that supports programs advocating the human rights of lesbian, gay, bisexual and transgender (LGBTQ) people around the world through public-private partnerships.

The GEF makes $3 million available to civil society organizations worldwide through small grants and requests for proposal.

The government of Norway has pledged financial support for the GEF.

The GEF has partnered with the mGive Foundation in order to solicit donations via mobile phones, and has fundraised with other organizations such as the Human Rights Campaign and the Elton John AIDS Foundation.

The announcement of the GEF won support from Freedom House and the Human Rights Campaign.

== See also ==
- Bisexual American history
- Gay Lib v. University of Missouri
- Gay men in American history
- Lesbian American history
- LGBTQ social movements
- Libertarian perspectives on gay rights
- Socialism and LGBT rights
- Gay Blue Jeans Day
- Society for Human Rights
- Join the Impact
- Timeline of LGBTQ history
- Transgender American history
- Coming out
- Intersex human rights
- Intersex rights by country
