= LGBTQ student movement =

LGBT activism by students

The origin of the LGBTQ student movement can be linked to other activist movements from the mid-20th century in the United States. The civil rights movement and second-wave feminist movement were working towards equal rights for other minority groups in the United States. Though the student movement began a few years before the Stonewall riots, the riots helped to spur the student movement to take more action in the US. Despite this, the overall view of these gay liberation student organizations received minimal attention from contemporary LGBTQ historians. This oversight stems from the idea that the organizations were founded with haste as a result of the riots. Others historians argue that this group gives too much credit to groups that disagree with some of the basic principles of activist LGBTQ organizations.

Though the times and places of the student movement vary, the goals are often similar, including: abolishing sodomy laws, equality on campuses for LGBTQ students, increasing money for HIV/AIDS research, the legalization of same-sex marriage, to prevent the bullying and suicide of LGBTQ youth, and gain visibility for LGBTQ people. LGBTQ student organizations today have started to involve research to improve the understanding of basic activism ideas. Using historical research as a source to identify and differentiate successful approaches. The identities of student activists and their involvement tend to shape the different organizations across campuses. The student movements have not always been successful in their goals, but they have been able to bring visibility to the LGBTQ community in their area as well as working to promote equality for a better future for their community.

== Australia ==
Many colleges in Australia have a Students' union that helps support LGBTQ student activism financially and otherwise. Often the right to have a safe space and LGBTQ officers is written into the student union policy. The LGBTQ student activists use media to help spread the word about issues in Australia that they deem important to the community such as Same-sex marriage. This means that LGBTQ students in Australia's colleges and universities have good visibility on their campuses. The students are using this visibility to try to get same-sex marriage legalized in their country.

The topic of same-sex marriage being legalized in Australia was brought to the forefront of LGBTQ students when it became legal in Canada. Two same-sex couples traveled to Canada in order to be able to marry their partners, and then attempted to get their marriage recognized when they came back to Australia. The government then used the Marriage Act 1961 (Australia) in order to deny the recognition of the legality of their marriages. The students want to change the definition of marriage so that it is a less fascist convention and is closer to their own views of what marriage should be.

== India ==
Many schools and colleges in India have LGBTQ+ support groups that help LGBTQ+ Youth by providing every kind of support required. The LGBTQ+ support groups also educate and raise awareness about LGBTQ+. Schools and college students have actively been taking part in activism through social media. These support groups also aim to eradicate bullying and social discrimination LGBTQ+ youth faces, legalization of gay marriage, serving openly in the Indian armed forces, etc.

== China ==
Groups of student activists are attempting to change teaching material in Chinese schools they believe may cause discrimination towards LGBT students. The move for this is due to the Guangzhou-based Gay and Lesbian Campus Association report that shows that 40% of the mentions within the Chinese textbooks refer to homosexuality as a mental illness. Along with changes to the textbooks, the groups want universities to allow LGBT student organizations and groups on campuses which are not accepted well on campuses either. Another thing the group wants to promote is better protection for LGBT students from bullies since 3/4 of students mention having been bullied because of their sexuality. The groups hope to change this or eliminate it by changing regulations and rules within the schools.

== Mexico ==
In 2004, the American School Foundation, a private American school in Mexico City, Mexico, was the first school in Mexico to create a Gay–straight alliance.

The GSA has succeeded in bringing attention to issues of discrimination towards the LGBTQ students and opened up a school-wide discussion about what the LGBTQ students deal with at school. The GSA is working to provide support and safe space for LGBT students, providing information about and for LGBTQ, and raise awareness for LGBTQ issues.

== Canada ==
The country's first gay liberation movement was started at the University of Toronto in 1969 and was originally called the University of Toronto Homophile Association (UTHA). The current iteration is now called LGBTOUT for lesbians, gays, bisexuals, and trans people, of the University of Toronto. The Homophile Association was created as a student-run organization to help other LGBT students socialize in a safe environment where they would not be judged for their sexual orientation, gender identity, or gender expression. Their first meeting had 16 students, but their group was quickly populating the room they had booked for meetings.

Waterloo Universities' Gay Liberation Movement (WUGLM) was formed in 1971 at the University of Waterloo and originally encompassed both the University of Waterloo and Wilfrid Laurier University. It is the country's oldest continuous running LGBT student organization, which is now called the Glow Centre for Sexual and Gender Diversity. Its first meeting had over 100 people attend. The organization was centered on fighting for equal rights in all branches of life including marriage and adoption rights. They ran social events, led protests, and arranged support circles. There were other organizations that began earlier than WUGLM but none has operated continuously. The University of Guelph started their "University of Guelph Homophile Association" on February 23, 1971, however it ended later in 1971 and was not restarted until 1973. The University of Western Ontario Homophile Association was start in October 1971, moved off campus in 1974 and eventually disbanded in 2005.

In 2017, the Conservative party in Ontario announced plans to repeal the 2015 sex-education curriculum and replace it with the 1998 version to give the party time to develop a new curriculum that pleases educators and parents. Students staged a walk-out against repealing the 2015 curriculum which included topics like same-sex marriage, consent, and gender identity. The walk-out had close to 90% participation in some schools.

In 2019, the United Conservative party in Alberta announced plans to overturn a law that makes it illegal for teachers to inform parents of their child's attendance in their school's Gay Straight Alliance (GSA) club. In response, students led protests in 90 schools which had anywhere from dozens to hundreds of students protesting.

In 2019, a counter-rally was held in support of sexual orientation and gender identity rights in Vancouver on the University of British Columbia's Point Grey campus. Jenn Smith, a transgender male, was set to hold an event on UBC's campus about how transgender politics in schools harm children and how they harm women in society. Dozens of student protestors held signs discouraging Smith from speaking claiming his talk was hate speech as it was transphobic.

== United States ==
=== History ===
==== Student Homophile League ====
In the US the student movement began in secret in the 1950s and 1960s. In 1966, Stephen Donaldson and a few other students at Columbia University used the structure of the Mattachine Society to form an underground society called the Student Homophile League. That year, the group could not get university recognition due to the group not giving a list of names of the members to the school to protect them. This led to no funding or space for the group. This made it difficult to gain new members. Nevertheless, Donaldson found a way to get recognition by the university, and the group became the first recognized student gay rights group.

After hearing about the SHL at Columbia, students at Cornell University in Ithaca, NY began inquiring about starting their own branch on campus. The Cornell Daily Sun reported that the administration would not stop a group from forming on campus, following a tradition of acknowledging contested groups on campus. Jearld Moldenhauer founded the group in 1968 and similar to the experience Donaldson faced at Columbia, students were hesitant to join, and membership remained low.

Students at Cornell who joined SHL did so under pseudonyms. At the beginning there were more heterosexual students than homosexual students, partially to attract members but at the same time was used as a protection strategy. By spring 1969 group tensions were high and a split began to occur, as some members wanted to keep focus on civil liberties and others wanted the group to only focus on gay and lesbian issues. By 1971 the group became known as the Gay Liberation Front, which was associated with such groups on the Cornell campus as the Students for a Democratic Society (SDS).

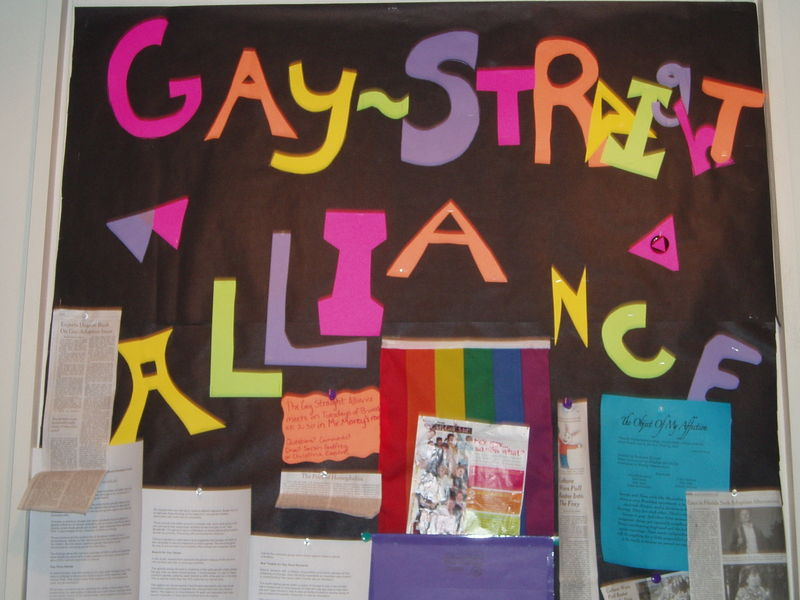
Gay Straight Alliance Sign

==== FREE (Fight Repression of Erotic Expression) ====
FREE (Fight Repression of Erotic Expression), founded on May 18, 1969, in Minneapolis's West Bank neighborhood, marks an early effort in the LGBT rights movement. It emerged as the first gay organization in Minnesota and the second gay student organization in the United States. The group aimed to address discrimination against LGBT individuals through activities such as advocating for same-sex marriage rights and picketing against discriminatory employers. FREE's members engaged in debates and advocacy, directing their efforts towards both radical change and legal reform within a society that often showed resistance. Though not officially tied to any single educational institution, FREE was closely associated with the University of Minnesota due to its foundation and activities within the Minneapolis area, home to the university's main campus.

Koreen Phelps and Stephen Ihrig, among others, played essential roles in founding FREE.

=== K-12 ===
In 1989 there were no known GSAs in any high school or junior high within the United States even though 97% of high school students admitted to hearing anti-gay remarks in school and many LGBT students felt unsafe enough that they would skip classes. Then LGBT and straight students at private schools in Massachusetts joined to create the first Gay–straight alliances. Even though the groups received much opposition, the groups popped up in more and more schools across the country. As of 2011, there are more than 4,000 GSAs in middle schools and high schools across the United States.

=== College and University ===
==== Arizona ====
The University of Arizona's LGBT student group, "Pride Alliance," has been active since the 1990s in providing visibility to LGBT students and faculty at the university. Some of the students' activism also works to provide a safe and welcoming environment for LGBT students. This goal stems from studies showing that LGBT college students have higher levels of depression, bullying, and suicide. Campus-wide activism, at the University of Arizona and at many colleges, has focused on dealing with these issues with respect for the LGBT community.

==== California ====
In 1972, the Gay Student Union (LGSU) formed at the Claremont Colleges, with meeting space provided at the Monsour Counseling Center. The union's name went through several changes: the Lesbian and Gay Student Union (LGSU) in 1982/83, and the Lesbian, Gay, Bisexual Resource Center (LGBRC) in 1992, when dedicated space was provided at Walker Residence Hall. The space was referred to as The Closet and was actually a closet. In 1995, the LGBRC finally changed its name to the Queer Resource Center (QRC) and became an official center funded by all 7 colleges. Eventually, the GRC was provided with an entire staffed building on campus.

==== Florida ====
A renewed interest in LGBT rights brought about the formation of the Florida Collegiate Pride Coalition in 2003 with chapter from Florida Gulf Coast University, University of Central Florida, University of Miami, and University of South Florida. The group holds an annual conference where multiple LGBT Social groups meet up, including people from out of state. In 2011, the group agreed to expand to help the LGBT members and allies network with college organizations to develop growth in its members personal and professional lives. This forum of LGBT college and university students in Florida is known to work with Equality Florida.

==== Louisiana ====
Louisiana State University, the flagship University of Louisiana, has progressively increased the awareness of LGBT organizations throughout campus. Spectrum was an organization that began in 1977 by and for LSU students as the Gay and Lesbian Student Association. Originally students involved did not feel particularly accepted so, in turn, held their meetings at off-campus locations. In 1999 a group of students felt unhappy with the mainly private nature of the LGBT movement so they formed the Spectrum Alliance. This became the public activism group that now holds over 100 members on LSU's campus.

In the fall of 2014 LSU also added a program that allows students to minor in LGBT studies. It consists of an 18-hour curriculum pinpointing social sciences created by Dr. Elaine M. Maccio who teaches in social work - where the minor is also housed. The new found program allows students who desire to obtain a better understanding of LGBT ideals and activism now have the opportunity to do so for course credit.

==== Indiana ====
In 2012, the students at University of Notre Dame were able to get an official LGBT organization after requesting the addition of one 15 times. Notre Dame was the last of the top 20 universities in the United States to add an LGBT organization. The students at Notre Dame were able to get the group by assessing the environment on campus for the LGBT students and writing a review that was submitted to the president of the school. After five months of review, the president decided that allowing the organization went along with the school's policies to embrace inclusivity.

==== Minnesota ====
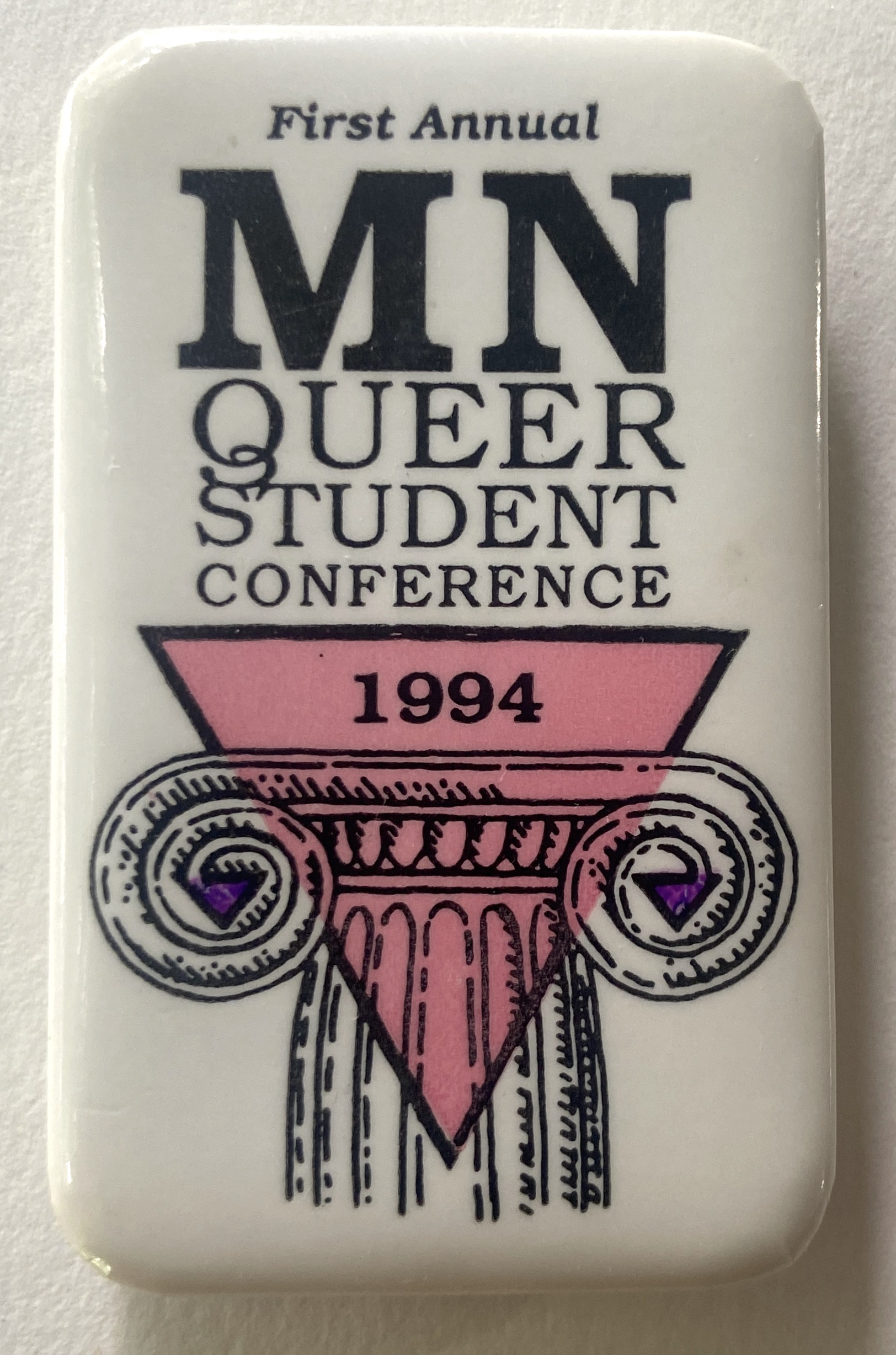
Pin button for the Minnesota Queer Student Conference

In May of 1994, LGBTQ student organizations located on and off Minnesota college campuses held a conference on the campus of the University of Minnesota, Minneapolis. Sessions included reports from representatives of college LGBT groups across Minnesota and UW-Madison on attitudes towards LGBT individuals and groups on their campus and activities and goals of their group. A directory of Minnesota LGBT student organizations was created for conference attendees.

==== Pennsylvania ====
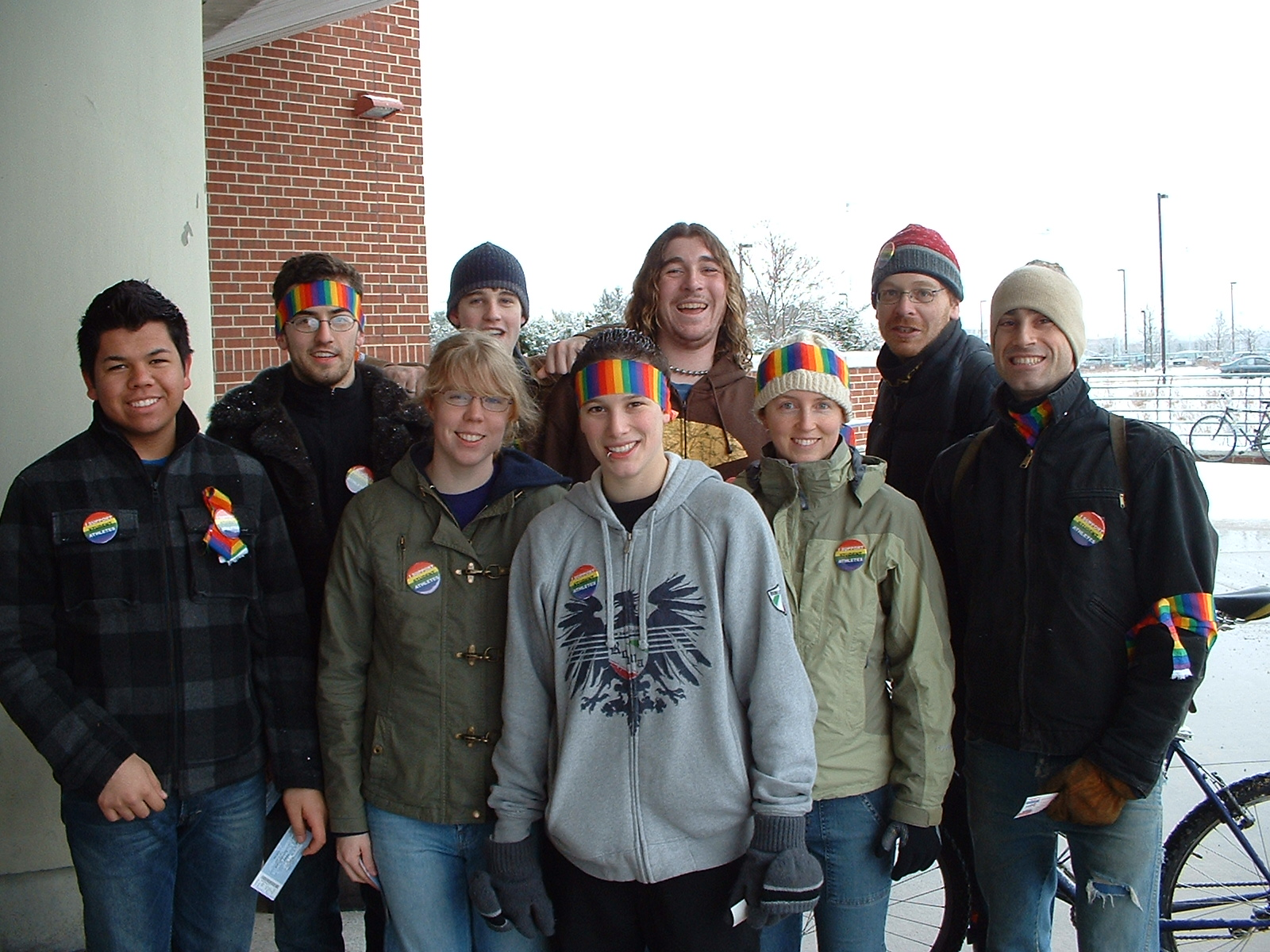
Penn State LGBT Student Activists

In the Commonwealth of Pennsylvania, The Pennsylvania Student Equality Coalition was founded as an independent and youth-led statewide LGBT organization by Pennsylvania students in April 2011. As of 2012, PSEC is connected with over 70 student LGBT organizations across Pennsylvania. The coalition is focused on campus-community organizing for LGBT equality in Pennsylvania and resource development for educational institutions.

==== Interactions and Inclusiveness on College Campuses ====
Over the last several years a number of studies have been done on interventions and interactions among students and LGBT groups on college campuses. Numerous studies have concluded that the more interactions undergraduates have with the LGBT community on campus, the more accepting attitudes are in the following ways "1.Same-sex, consensual sex. 2. Same-sex relations between adults is not unnatural. 3. Vote for a gay presidential candidate. 4. Friends with a feminine man. 5. Friends with a masculine woman. 6. Knowledge of [gay and lesbian] issues important for a future career. 7. Comfortable with a [gay, lesbian] roommate." Students who frequently interact and involve themselves with campus activities are likely to be more open to views different from their own.

Students who are present when an LGBT student is being harassed frequently will depend on the relation between the two. Meaning, that if the bystander knows the bullying victim or is known around campus themselves, it is more likely that they will intervene. However, intervention is less likely to occur when passive bystanders are present. Studies show that it is important for universities to foster initiatives that increase LGBT bystander interventions.

Over the past decade, academic institutions have been making strides in aiding LGBT students on campus. These inclusive resources include the creation of gender- neutral housing and bathrooms, educational programming, and creating other initiatives to help foster equality. However, according to a 2010 study done at multiple institutions indicated from responses by LGBT students, that LGBT students were more likely to receive harassment and discrimination that heterosexuals. Therefore, resulting in lower education outcomes, low self- esteem, and wakened emotional, mental, and physical health.

==== LGBTQ Inclusion ====
One of the ways that heterosexism is enabled on college campuses was through heterosexist language and communicated anti-gay sentiments towards LGBTQ people. One factor that effects the college climate they experience is how they choose or if they choose to disclose their identities. Resources have been created to help promote non-hostile environments are initiatives like The Transgender On-Campus NonDiscrimination Project (TONI). TONI is an online resource center for students, faculty, and staff alike to learn about and gather general information on transgender students in higher education.

LGBTQ Resource Centers have been created on campus to help students have a welcoming space on campus. However, many argue that LGBTQ rights in the United States primarily focus on as gay and lesbian people. This leaves out those who identify as transgender and queer. According to a study on transgender centers on campuses, there are many events that relate to trans issues, but instead of being with these communities, the programming created is about the transgender community. Including and fostering the "practice and process" of inclusion should remain the primary focus rather than a "singular point of 'liberation'".

== See also ==
- Bisexual American history
- Coming out
- Gay Blue Jeans Day
- Gay men in American history
- Join the Impact
- Lesbian American history
- LGBTQ rights in the United States
- LGBTQ social movements
- LGBTQ student center
- Libertarian perspectives on gay rights
- Socialism and LGBT rights
- Society for Human Rights
- Student activism
- Timeline of LGBTQ history
- Transgender American history
