= Balliett =

Balliett is a surname. Notable people with the surname include:

- Amy Balliett (born 1982), American businesswoman
- Blue Balliett (born 1955), American writer
- Mrs. L. Dow Balliett (1847–1929), American writer, clubwoman
- Whitney Balliett (1926–2007), American jazz critic and book reviewer

== See also ==
- D. M. Balliet (1866–1960), American football player and coach
