= Louise Lawrence =

Louise Lawrence may refer to:

- Louise Lawrence (author) (1943–2013), English science fiction author
- Louise de Kiriline Lawrence (1894–1992), naturalist, author, and nurse
- Louise Lawrence (activist) (1912–1976), American transgender activist
