= Amy Balliett =

American entrepreneur (born 1982)

- Born: October 1982; Cleveland, Ohio
- Occupation: Entrepreneur
- Years active: 2009—present
- Known for: Killer Visual Strategies

Amy Balliett (born October 1982) is an American entrepreneur and gay rights activist. She is best known for being the founder and CEO of Killer Visual Strategies, an award-winning visual communication agency located in Seattle.

== Early life ==
Amy Balliett was born in October 1982 in Cleveland, Ohio. At age 17, Balliett became the proprietor of the Linwood Park Stand. The stand was already an established penny candy store and ice cream parlor in the center of the park. Balliett managed the business for two summers before attending college at Wright State University for two quarters. In the spring of 2002, Balliett transferred from Wright State to Cleveland State University to attend CSU's First College program. In just two and a half years, she graduated with a four-year BFA in cinematography with a minor in diversity marketing.

== Career ==
Upon graduation, Balliett moved to Seattle, Washington in 2004, where she started working in motion-picture marketing before fully moving into marketing. She has headed SEO at several companies. She and Nick Grant started the 7 Figure Project under which they created and eventually sold ZippyCart.com.

Balliett made news in 2008 as the person responsible for starting the Join the Impact organization with friend Willow Witte in response to the passage of Proposition 8 in California during the 2008 US elections. Join the Impact organized the National Day of Protest on November 15, 2008. The protest took place in more than 400 cities in every state in the country and in ten countries around the world. The protest was attended by an estimated one million people worldwide.

Balliett is included on a list of out influential people in The Advocate's "Forty under 40" issue of June/July 2009.

Baillett enjoys public speaking and has spoken at over 100 conferences in her career including Adobe MAX (2013), SXSW (2017), Cloudinary's ImageCon (2019), Content Marketing World (recurring), and CreativePro events (recurring) to name a few. She has lectured at institutions such as the School of Visual Concepts, LinkedIn Learning, and Vancouver Community College.

In 2009, Balliett and her co-founder Nick Grant partnered to build lead generation–based websites. In the fall of 2010, the business pivoted to an entirely new model: visual communication design. In the years following, Killer Infographics became the leader in its industry, driving visual strategy and campaigns for such global brands as Microsoft, Boeing, Adobe, Nikon, Starbucks, the National Endowment for the Arts, and the United Nations. Nick Grant left the company in 2017. In 2019, Killer changed its name to Killer Visual Strategies. and it was acquired by LRW Group in early 2019 in an agency roll up that has become Material.

In 2020, Balliett published her first book, Killer Visual Strategies with Wiley Publishing. The book won several awards including being recognized as one of the Best Marketing & Sales Books of 2020 by the prestigious Porchlight Book Awards.

Today, Balliett travels the nation delivering corporate training and keynote presentations about the power of AI in visual strategy and marketing.

== Personal life ==
Balliett has an older brother and sister. Their mom owned a fabric store and their dad sold hydraulics for a major firm in Ohio; they are both entrepreneurs. Balliett met her wife Jessica Trejo in 2006 at a coffee shop concert in Seattle's Capitol Hill; the couple married in California in 2008 a month before the state stopped granting marriage licenses to same-sex couples. She lives in Seattle, Washington.
