= Glow Centre for Sexual and Gender Diversity =

Canadian student-run 2SLGBTQ+ group

- Formation: 1971; 55 years ago
- Type: LGBT student centre
- Region served: University of Waterloo
- Parent organization: Waterloo Undergraduate Student Association
- Website: wusa.ca/services/student-run-services/glow/
- Formerly called: Waterloo Universities Gay Liberation Movement; Gay Liberation of Waterloo; Gays and Lesbians of Waterloo

The Glow Centre for Sexual and Gender Diversity at the University of Waterloo is Canada's oldest, continually running university-based 2SLGBTQ+ group. Founded in 1971 as the Waterloo Universities Gay Liberation Movement, the group is run by student volunteers.

== History ==
The Glow Centre for Sexual and Gender Diversity was founded in 1971 as the Waterloo Universities Gay Liberation Movement (WUGLM). The reference to Universities reflected that the group was open to students at Wilfrid Laurier University despite being located on the University of Waterloo campus. Within 18 months of the group's founding WUGLM president John Dunbar told reporter Paul Kidd that membership was about 150 men and women, including some faculty members.

The name of group was changed to Gay Liberation of Waterloo in 1980 and to Gays & Lesbians of Waterloo in 1985, introducing the acronym which is the basis for Glow Centre for Sexual and Gender Diversity. Run entirely by student volunteers, the group offers education resources and peer support in addition to holding social events and advancing advocacy issue. Glow is the longest running student-run 2SLGBTQ+ organization in Canada. Speaking at the group's 25th anniversary event, Canadian NDP MP Svend Robinson said: "It would never have been possible for me to come out publicly if it had not been for the work of individuals like these."

=== Operation Socrates Handbook ===
In 1973, members of what was then the Waterloo University Gay Liberation Movement (WUGLM) produced the Operation Socrates Handbook, an educational resource about homosexuality. The introduction to the publication explained that its purpose was to "answer some basic questions and explore various viewpoints which affect a large part of the human spectrum of sexuality". It is recognized by the Lesbian and Gay Liberation in Canada project as "one of the first education-information publications of the Canadian gay movement."

The creation of the Operation Socrates Handbook was funded by a $9,290 Opportunities for Youth grant from the federal government. At the time of the funding announcement, the grant project officer was reported in The Canadian Press as saying: "This project was highly supported by professionals and our selecting committee and had letters of support from psychologists, nurses, and social agencies." In addition to facts about homosexuality, the handbook included a question-and-answer section, articles about homosexuality with regards to the law and the church, and the contact information for gay resources centers in Canada.

Four thousand copies of the handbook were printed and sent to schools across Canada, including universities, colleges, crisis centers, and high school guidance departments. Demand for the handbook was high with letters of thanks arriving at WUGLM offices from individuals and organizations. Based on the response, the editors looked into raising additional funds for a second printing.

Despite the positive reception from readers, critical views shared in letters to the editor of the Kitchener-Waterloo Record prompted Margaret Murray to write her letter responding to claims the handbook was being forced on people: "It is not a sexual manual with picture illustrations. All photos are of individuals doing everyday-type things. It is a booklet verbalizing many facts about homosexuality, which are very seldom voiced. It is an attempt to destroy some of the myths."

Anger about the perceived intent of the handbook eventually gained national attention leading Liberal Senator Raymond Perault to call for examination into government financing of the publication. Conservative MP Alfred Hales, then chairman of Parliament's Public Accounts Committee, raised similar concerns about the project's funding in a letter to State Secretary Hugh Faulkner. In a response, Faulkner acknowledged that while the project was controversial, it had been "carefully scrutinized" and the creators confirmed that no unsolicited copies would be distributed to minors. He also made reference to various people who supported the project and acted as resource consultants.

=== Surveillance ===
Although then justice minister Pierre Trudeau removed homosexuality from Canada's criminal code as part of the Criminal Law Amendment Act, 1968–69, the activities of WUGLM and its publications, including the Operation Socrates Handbook, were of interest to the Royal Canadian Mounted Police Security Service. A file about WUGLM was created by the service within a month of the group's founding and their publications were collected and reported on to security officials.
