= Gay Blue Jeans Day =

Gay rights event in American colleges

Gay Blue Jeans Day, alternatively National Gay Blue Jeans Day or just Gay Jeans Day is a celebration frequently advertised on college campuses in the United States in coordination with World AIDS Day, Gay Equality Day, Gay Pride Week, or National Coming Out Day. Students are encouraged to wear jeans on a particular day to communicate their support of gay rights.

The organizers of Gay Jeans Day at CMU analyse the action in this way.

- To let LGBT students on their campus know there is a supportive community.
- Jeans are chosen for this event because most people have a pair, and because deciding what to wear causes everyone—no matter what their sexual orientation—to think about how other people will react to their choice of clothing.
- Allow straight people to think about how others will react to their perceived sexual orientation, and to experience having to alter their normal behavior to avoid being perceived as gay.

During campus debates in the early 1990s about such Jeans Days, the Lesbian and Gay Alliance at Bowling Green State University published a letter to the local newspaper indicating that part of the logic of using a common piece of clothing such as jeans was to demonstrate that, when jeans indicated participation in affirming such rights, people would deliberately wear another form of clothing in tacit protest.

Many supporters of the protest argued that the protest was effective because it forced heterosexuals to do something to actively engage in homophobia (wear something else that day), or wear their usual attire (blue jeans) and become possible targets of homophobia themselves, and that many people unaware of the protest might wear blue jeans and be educated by becoming targets of homophobia. Others argue that the protest simply forces everyone to examine their own personal relationship to homophobia by leaving no space to be uninterested.

== Date ==
The date and name of 'wear Blue Jeans if You're Gay Day' 'Jeans Day', 'Gay Jeans Day' etc. varies with place and time. BSC celebrates on October 11, the same day as National Coming Out Day. Other universities celebrate the day some time during Pride month (June) or on a day when many students will be on campus (e.g., the first day of the semester).

== History ==
"Jeans Day" began at Rutgers University in 1974.
