= Libertarian perspectives on LGBTQ rights =

Political ideology

Libertarian perspectives on LGBTQ rights illustrate how libertarian individuals and political parties have applied the libertarian philosophy to the subject of lesbian, gay, bisexual and transgender (LGBTQ) rights. In general, libertarians oppose laws which limit the sexual freedom of adults. However, they may also oppose hate crime legislation, viewing it as antithetical to freedom of speech, and oppose private sector anti-discrimination laws on the grounds that it would constitute government overreach into the free market system.

== By country ==
=== Canada ===
==== Libertarian Party of Canada ====
On transgender equality, the Libertarian Party of Canada states: "Comedians are being fined by Human Rights Commissions and Bill C 16 arguably compels speech". Bill C16 is properly titled "An Act to amend the Canadian Human Rights Act and the Criminal Code". The bill adds "gender identity or expression" to the list of prohibited grounds of discrimination in the Canadian Human Rights Act and the list of characteristics of identifiable groups protected from hate propaganda in the Criminal Code.

=== France ===
==== Liberal Alternative ====
The Liberal Alternative party states: "We wish to make marriage a private affair, whether religious or not, composed simply of two consenting adults, without regard for sex, and with no further obligation beyond going to the local magistrate/city hall to notify the state about the union. This form of civil union would replace the PACS symbolically. Recognition of marriage is, of course, possible".

=== New Zealand ===
==== ACT ====
The minority populist factions of the ACT Party oppose same-sex marriage which voted in 2005 for a law that would outlaw instead being in favour of civic unions, while the dominant majority of the party are in favour.

==== Libertarians ====
Libertarians stated in their platform that the party "fully supports the concept of a civil union and would also support allowing marriages between same sex couples, and indeed polygamous marriages or marriages between people who are already related—in all cases as long as all parties are adults and consenting". The organization ceased to exist in February 2014.

=== Russia ===
==== Libertarian Party of Russia ====
The Libertarian Party of Russia has been one of the most active vocal opponents of the 2013 Russian law banning "propaganda of homosexuality" among minors. Libertarian Party activists have participated in demonstrations in front of the Moscow City Duma against the adoption of the law. At a 2012 picket, the Libertarian Party announced its opposition to homophobic laws restricting people's right to freedom of speech.

=== United States ===
==== Anarcho-capitalists ====
Anarcho-capitalists believe in stateless voluntary society; thus, they oppose any law supporting or opposing LGBT rights. The issue of LGBT rights would be left up individually for people to decide whether to support or oppose LGBT rights. Adam Kokesh argues that LGBT people should be anarcho-capitalists.

==== Libertarian Party ====
At the first national convention of the Libertarian Party in 1972, the delegates unanimously adopted a platform that included the statement "We favor the repeal of all laws creating 'crimes without victims' ... such as laws on voluntary sexual relations ..." Multiple sources, including the Libertarian Party themselves, have referred to John Hospers, who was in 1972 the first presidential nominee of the newly formed Libertarian Party, as the first openly gay person to run for president of the United States. However, The Guardian’s obituary stated that his family “strenuously denied” he was gay. Chase Oliver, who is openly gay, became the Libertarian Party's presidential nominee in 2024.

In 1975, Ralph Raico helped to create the Libertarian For Gay Rights caucus within the party and subsequently published Gay Rights: A Libertarian Approach. This pamphlet advocated for removal of all restrictions against gays, including repeal of legislation prohibiting unions between members of the same sex. It also, however, opposed laws forbidding private individuals from discriminating against gays, e.g., by refusing to hire them, or to rent or sell houses or apartments to gays, stating "our principles compel us to say that bigotry and prejudice, so long as they do not involve coercion, must also be tolerated."

The second LGBT rights organization to operate from a libertarian perspective was the Libertarians for Gay and Lesbian Concerns. The organization held its first national convention in 1985 and sought to promote libertarianism to LGBT Americans.

In 1998, Outright Libertarians was formed. Outright Libertarians are also affiliated with the Libertarian Party and take many of the same positions that the Libertarians for Gay and Lesbian Concerns did in the 1980s.

In 2009, the Libertarian Party came out against H.R. 1913, a proposed hate crime bill that would add to the federal hate crime statute the categories of sexual orientation, gender identity and disability. The reason the Libertarian Party opposed the proposed hate crimes bill was because it would violate equal justice under the law by creating different classes of victims for the same crime. The Libertarian Party also accused legislators of attempting to buy the support of the LGBT community while still opposing same-sex marriage, and challenged them to repeal Don't ask, don't tell.

In 2013, the Libertarian Party applauded the Supreme Court's decision United States v. Windsor to strike down Section 3 of the Defense of Marriage Act (DOMA) as unconstitutional. The Libertarian Party had come out in favor of marriage equality, although noting that their ideal society would "not have government in the business of defining relationships at all."

The Libertarian Party currently (as of 2015) takes the following positions relevant to LGBT rights:

- Section 1.2 "Expression and Communication":
  - We support full freedom of expression and oppose government censorship, regulation or control of communications media and technology. We favor the freedom to engage in or abstain from any religious activities that do not violate the rights of others. We oppose government actions which either aid or attack any religion.
- Section 1.3 "Personal Relationships":
  - Sexual orientation, preference, gender, or gender identity should have no impact on the government's treatment of individuals, such as in current marriage, child custody, adoption, immigration or military service laws. Government does not have the authority to define, license or restrict personal relationships. Consenting adults should be free to choose their own sexual practices and personal relationships.
- Section 1.6 "Parental Rights":
  - Parents, or other guardians, have the right to raise their children according to their own standards and beliefs. This statement shall not be construed to condone child abuse or neglect.
- Section 3.5 "Rights and Discrimination":
  - Libertarians embrace the concept that all people are born with certain inherent rights. We reject the idea that a natural right can ever impose an obligation upon others to fulfill that "right." We condemn bigotry as irrational and repugnant. Government should neither deny nor abridge any individual's human right based upon sex, wealth, ethnicity, creed, age, national origin, personal habits, political preference or sexual orientation. Members of private organizations retain their rights to set whatever standards of association they deem appropriate, and individuals are free to respond with ostracism, boycotts and other free-market solutions.
- Section 4.0 "Omissions":
  - Our silence about any other particular government law, regulation, ordinance, directive, edict, control, regulatory agency, activity, or machination should not be construed to imply approval.

== See also ==
- Liberalism worldwide
- Objectivism and homosexuality
