= Louise Lawrence (activist) =

American transgender activist, artist, writer

Louise Lawrence (1912–1976) was an American transgender activist, artist, writer, and lecturer. She organized a network of gender non-conforming people across the US and abroad, and advocated for transgender issues during the mid-20th century. She was an early founder of the magazine Transvestia. Historian Susan Stryker wrote, "If there is an unheralded founder of the transgender community in the United States, it's Louise Lawrence."

== Personal life ==
Lawrence was born in 1912 and was assigned male at birth. She began wearing traditionally feminine clothing at a young age and would wear her mother's clothes. In 1930, she married and, when she was twenty-two, had a daughter. After the death of her first wife, she married a woman who at first accepted her wearing gender-affirming clothing, but they divorced three years later. After the divorce, Lawrence lived full-time as a woman in Berkeley and starting in 1947, in San Francisco, initially with a "close" female roommate.

In 1950s she co-owned a tenant house with an US Army nurse, Gay Elkins, and they frequently traveled together. In 1957, when Elkins was stationed in Germany, Lawrence acquired a passport with a female gender marker, leading to Elkins being dishonorably discharged from the army on suspicion of lesbianism. After State Department reconsidered the passport suspecting identity fraud, Elkins won an appeal, retroactively rendering her honorably discharged with full veteran benefits. Later the State Department reversed their previous decision, allowing Lawrence to use and travel with a female passport.

Although she considered gender reassignment surgery, she chose not to pursue it, and instead experimented with hormone treatment, under the guidance of Harry Benjamin. She wrote, "I firmly believe that most transvestites have that same urge [for a sex change] but in varying degrees and areas".

Of her transition, Lawrence wrote in one of her journals:

I consider Louise to be my true identity even though the birth records say differently. And on this I will stand. For to me, as to most people who know me, I AM Louise.

Lawrence was also an artist and sold paintings. She wrote a 117-page autobiography and a shorter autobiographical text, both of which are unpublished and housed at the Louise Lawrence Collection in the Kinsey Institute Archives.

== Community organizing ==
Throughout her life, Lawrence corresponded with and built an extensive network of transgender people across the Bay Area, the US, and globally, by placing personal ads in magazines and contacting people who had been arrested for cross-dressing. Through Lawrence's network, members connected and collectivized, sharing information about doctors, medical procedures and comparing surgical results. She was known to house transgender people, including those who had traveled to seek surgery in San Francisco. Her network also included gay female impersonators, drag queens, April Ashley and Arthur Corbett.

Lawrence was a member of the Mattachine Society of San Francisco and affiliated with the homophile movement in San Francisco. In 1964, Lawrence, José Sarria and four other homophile leaders met with religious leaders to advocate for sexual minorities.

In 1942, Virginia Prince visited Lawrence after Prince attended one of Lawrence's lectures. Lawrence subsequently introduced Prince to her colleagues in transgender-oriented medical research and Prince would later become a leading transgender activist. In 1952, Lawrence helped to publish, along with Prince and others, the newsletter "Transvestia: Journal of the American Society for Equality in Dress", which hoped to combat discrimination against cross-dressers and educate researchers about transvestism. Although the publication was grown by Virginia Prince after 1960, the paper's first edition was largely funded by and distributed to the people in Lawrence's network.

== Medical community ==
From the 1940s until her death, Lawrence sought to educate the public about gender nonconformity. To achieve this, she acted as a key interface between medical researchers and her network within the transgender community. She wrote, "I am trying to gather as much information... as possible in order that medical men... will be able to help people that come to them."

In 1942, she met leading psychiatrist Karl Bowman, the director of the Langley Porter Psychiatric Clinic at University of California, San Francisco. She frequently lectured on transgender topics to Bowman's colleagues at the university. Through Bowman, Lawrence met Harry Benjamin, a researcher in transsexual medicine from Germany, and introduced him to her contacts in the transgender community. According to former colleagues, Benjamin used Lawrence as a "sounding board for many of his ideas" and Lawrence wrote that she appreciated Benjamin as "one of the few medical men in this country who has any understanding of this problem." Lawrence also informed him of the early writings of David O. Cauldwell.

Lawrence worked closely with Alfred Kinsey. In a letter to Benjamin, she recounted:

In talking to Dr. Kinsey I brought up . . . my interest in transvestism . . . and to my surprise he said that he thought the problem was relatively rare. . . . I am very sure that it is much more common than most of us, even prominent doctors, are willing or able to admit... I was going to try and prove to him that I was right and he encouraged me by saying that any facts or figures I could contribute would be valuable.

By 1950, Kinsey had employed Lawrence to type the life histories of her acquaintances and to copy out manuscripts of transvestite fiction, especially an underground genre known as petticoat discipline. Lawrence encouraged her transgender peers to be interviewed by Kinsey for his research. When she shared with him her list of trans contacts in 1954, the list included nineteen people in the Bay Area and one hundred and fifty-two nationwide. She sent him a collected scrapbook of newspaper clippings, along with personal materials, such as her correspondence, a diary of the year she began her gender transition, photographs, and her autobiographical writing. Kinsey also contributed to "Transvestia".

Lawrence was critical of medical views on gender-affirmation surgery. After the high-profile transition of Christine Jorgensen, Lawrence wrote: "If only some of these American medical men could... not continually imagine that their own penis was removed when Christine's was, maybe we could see some sound thoughtful, imaginative progress made in the field."

== Legacy ==
Susan Stryker wrote that the work of Lawrence and others in connecting the transgender community with institutions of power "would produce long-lasting organizations and provide the base of a social movement". According to academic Joanne Meyerowitz, Lawrence wanted her contributions to science to be recognized.

An archive in Vallejo, California, is named after her. According to its website, "the goal of the Louise Lawrence Transgender Archive (LLTA) is to increase the understanding of transgender people and encourage new scholarship by making transgender historical materials available to students, scholars and the public."

In 2015, her archival material was exhibited at the exhibition "Bring Your Own Body" at Cooper Union curated by Jeanne Vaccaro with Stamatina Gregory. Chris E. Vargas designed a collage for the exhibition called "Transvestites in the News," named after the title Lawrence gave to her scrapbooks.
