= Join the Impact =

American LGBT political organization

- Screenshot of Join the Impact as of December 2008
- Website type: Advocacy
- Available in: English
- Owners: JTI Foundation, Inc.
- Creators: Amy Balliett and Willow Witte
- Website: www.jointheimpact.com
- Registration: Optional
- Launched: November 7, 2008; 17 years ago
- Current status: Online and Offline

Join the Impact was an American LGBTQ political organization started in reaction to the passage of Proposition 8 in California which rapidly developed into a national coalition of local LGBT rights groups. The website for the group was established November 7, 2008, after founders Amy Balliett and Willow Witte decided to utilize a website to try to galvanize attention for the cause. The level of success the two women had orchestrating a nationwide protest only a week later may have benefited from the recent historical success the Obama campaign had with the medium.

Join the Impact held November 15, 2008 anti-Proposition 8 protests against the California State proposition in every state in the U.S. The group's website claims that hundreds of thousands of protesters gathered that day with as many as 10,000 in NYC alone.

Facebook played a pivotal role in organizing, allowing headquarters for events to form, and communicate with participants locally. Additionally, the use of sites like Facebook prevented the website failures that happened early on due to the high numbers of users accessing the site. Despite given larger and larger server for free from Hostdango the site continued to crash. Wetpaint, a free website wiki community, offered to allow the group to develop a site page for each state.

Not long after the Wetpaint website came online, another site powered by Wetpaint was created in opposition of the site. The site, ProtectMarriage.wetpaint.com, encouraged people to join protests against same-sex marriage.

Join the Impact organized a National Day of Protest on November 15, 2008. The protest took place in over 400 cities in every state in the country and in ten countries around the world. The protest was attended by an estimated one million people worldwide. Join the Impact also helped organize Day Without a Gay on December 10, 2008. The event encouraged same sex marriage supporters to call in to work "gay" and do community service in their communities. Many also participated in an economic boycott that day by not spending any money. On December 20, 2008, Join the Impact organized Light Up The Night For Equality and the National LGBT Food Drive for Equality in cities across the country. Candlelight vigils were held in commercial centers and shopping malls in remembrance of the 18,000 same sex marriages performed in California between June and November 2008. An estimated one million people were educated about five rights not afforded to one in ten citizens simply because they were gay. The event garnered national attention, as well as the opposition of the Westboro Baptist Church, who held a counter protest at the Light Up the Night for Equality vigil in Chicago, Illinois. The event had pre and post event promotion from Equality California, the Human Rights Campaign, Courage Campaign, Marriage Equality USA, Logo, 365Gay.com, Students for Equality, Lez Get Real, and other organizations and groups.

There was a National Defense of Marriage Act Protest on January 10, 2009. The protest brought together signatures on a letter to President-Elect Barack Obama about his promises to the LGBT community. Join the Impact promised to deliver those signatures and letters to President Obama on January 21, 2009.

== See also ==
- Civil unions
- LGBT rights in the United States
- List of LGBT rights organizations
