= Gay Lib v. University of Missouri =

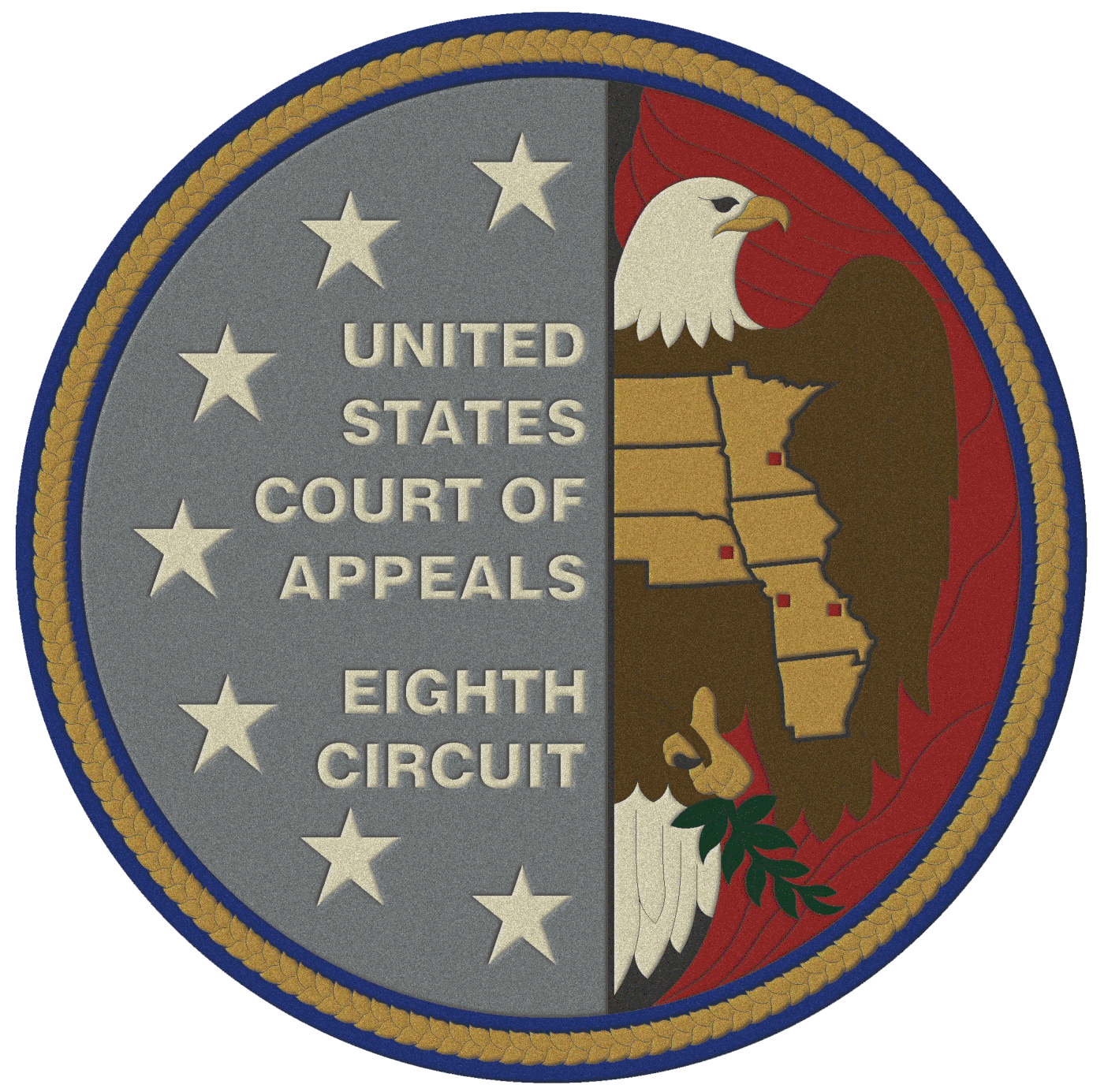
- Court: United States Court of Appeals for the Eighth Circuit
- Full case name: Gay Lib, et al v. University of Missouri, et al
- Argued: February 17, 1977
- Decided: June 8, 1977
- Citation: 558 F.2d 848 (8th Cir. 1977)

Case history
- Subsequent history: Rehearing en banc denied

Court membership
- Judges sitting: Donald P. Lay, William H. Webster, John K. Regan (E.D. Mo.)

Case opinions
- Majority: Lay, joined by Webster
- Concurrence: Webster
- Dissent: Regan
- Dissent: Floyd Robert Gibson (dissenting from denial of rehearing en banc), joined by Jesse Smith Henley
- Dissent: Roy Laverne Stephenson (dissenting from denial of rehearing en banc)

Laws applied
- First Amendment

Gay Lib v. University of Missouri, 558 F. 2d 848 (8th Cir. 1977), was a court case in 1977 about discrimination in student group recognition at state universities, namely the University of Missouri. The case reached the United States Court of Appeals for the Eighth Circuit. The courts determined that "the University, acting here as an instrumentality of the State, has no right to restrict speech or association 'simply because it finds the views expressed to be abhorrent'."
