= Malta declaration (International Intersex Forum) =

Statement of the third International Intersex Forum

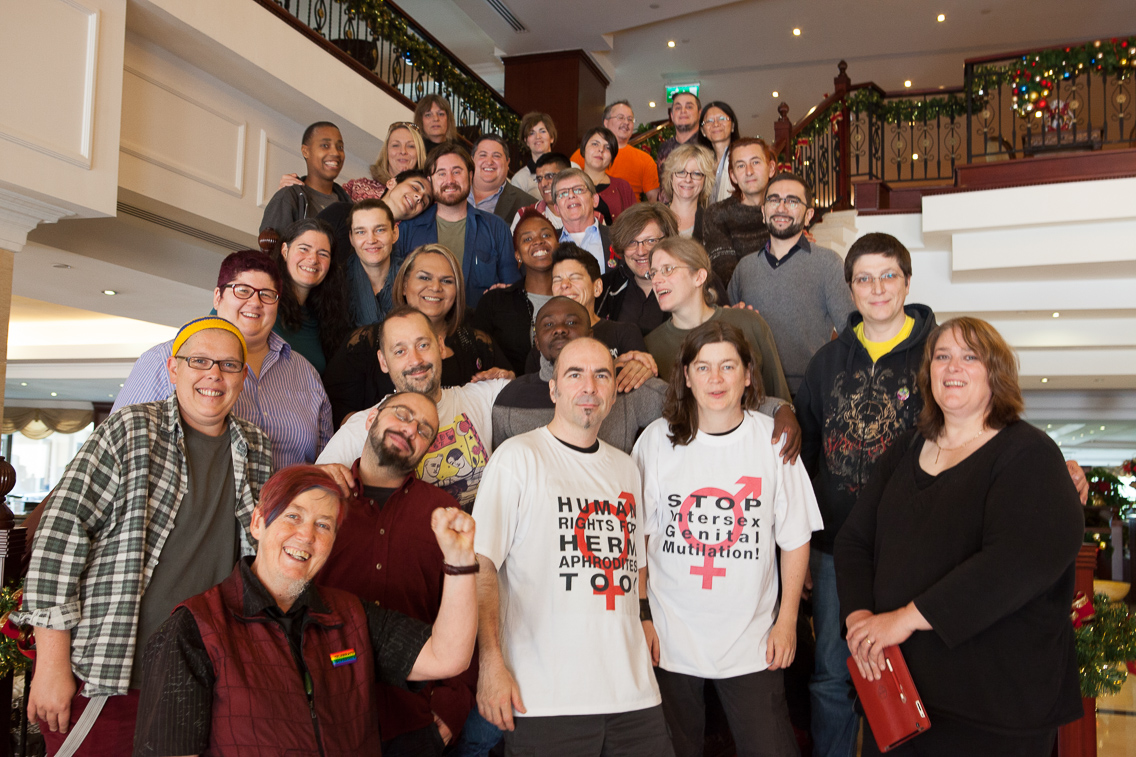
Participants at the Third International Intersex Forum where the Malta declaration was made, December 2013

The Malta declaration is the statement of the Third International Intersex Forum, which took place in Valletta, Malta, in 2013. The event was supported by the ILGA and ILGA-Europe and brought together 34 people representing 30 organisations from multiple regions of the world.

The declaration affirmed the existence of intersex people, and demanded an end to "discrimination against intersex people and to ensure the right of bodily integrity, physical autonomy and self-determination". For the first time, participants made a statement on birth registrations, in addition to other human rights issues:

== The declaration ==
- To put an end to mutilating and 'normalising' practices such as genital surgeries, psychological and other medical treatments through legislative and other means. Intersex people must be empowered to make their own decisions affecting own bodily integrity, physical autonomy and self-determination.
- To put an end to preimplantation genetic diagnosis, pre-natal screening and treatment, and selective abortion of intersex foetuses.
- To put an end to infanticide and killings of intersex people.
- To put an end to non-consensual sterilisation of intersex people.
- To depathologise variations in sex characteristics in medical guidelines, protocols and classifications, such as the World Health Organization's International Classification of Diseases.
- To register intersex children as females or males, with the awareness that, like all people, they may grow up to identify with a different sex or gender.
- To ensure that sex or gender classifications are amendable through a simple administrative procedure at the request of the individuals concerned. All adults and capable minors should be able to choose between female (F), male (M), non-binary or multiple options. In the future, as with race or religion, sex or gender should not be a category on birth certificates or identification documents for anybody.
- To raise awareness around intersex issues and the rights of intersex people in society at large.
- To create and facilitate supportive, safe and celebratory environments for intersex people, their families and surroundings.
- To ensure that intersex people have the right to full information and access to their own medical records and history.
- To ensure that all professionals and healthcare providers that have a specific role to play in intersex people's wellbeing are adequately trained to provide quality services.
- To provide adequate acknowledgement of the suffering and injustice caused to intersex people in the past, and provide adequate redress, reparation, access to justice and the right to truth.
- To build intersex anti-discrimination legislation in addition to other grounds, and to ensure protection against intersectional discrimination.
- To ensure the provision of all human rights and citizenship rights to intersex people, including the right to marry and form a family.
- To ensure that intersex people are able to participate in competitive sport, at all levels, in accordance with their legal sex. Intersex athletes who have been humiliated or stripped of their titles should receive reparation and reinstatement.
- Recognition that medicalization and stigmatisation of intersex people result in significant trauma and mental health concerns.
- In view of ensuring the bodily integrity and well-being of intersex people, autonomous non-pathologising psycho-social and peer support be available to intersex people throughout their life (as self-required), as well as to parents and/or care providers.

The forum called on:

1. International, regional and national human rights institutions to take on board, and provide visibility to intersex issues in their work.
2. National governments to address the concerns raised by the Intersex Forum and draw adequate solutions in direct collaboration with intersex representatives and organisations.
3. Media agencies and sources to ensure intersex people's right to privacy, dignity, accurate and ethical representation.
4. Funders to engage with intersex organisations and support them in the struggle for visibility, increase their capacity, the building of knowledge and the affirmation of their human rights.
5. Human rights organisations to contribute to build bridges with intersex organisations and build a basis for mutual support. This should be done in a spirit of collaboration and no-one should instrumentalise intersex issues as a means for other ends.

== Signatories ==
The Forum was organized by ILGA Europe's Silvan Agius and Ruth Baldacchino, and three intersex activists selected from an open call application process managed by ILGA Europe: Mauro Cabral, of Argentina, Mani Bruce Mitchell, of New Zealand, and Hida Viloria of Intersex Campaign for Equality. Attending participants included Sean Saifa Wall and Pidgeon Pagonis for AIC (now interACT), Morgan Carpenter and Tony Briffa from Organisation Intersex International Australia, Intersex Austria Holly Greenberry from Intersex UK, Miriam van der Have and Inge Intven of Nederlandse Netwerk Intersekse/DSD (NNID), and representatives of Zwischengeschlecht, and IVIM/OII Deutschland

== Adoption and legacy ==
The declaration has been cited by numerous human rights institutions around the world, including intersex human rights papers published by the Council of Europe's Commissioner for Human Rights, and the Asia Pacific Forum of National Human Rights Institutions, and by organizations allying themselves with the intersex human rights movement.

In 2015, Malta adopted world-first legislation to protect intersex infants and children from non-consensual medical interventions.

In March 2017, the Malta declaration was acknowledged by a consensus "Darlington Statement", published by Australian and New Zealand intersex community organizations and others. The statement calls for legal reform, including the criminalization of deferrable intersex medical interventions on children, an end to legal classification of sex, and improved access to peer support.

== See also ==
- Intersex human rights
- Intersex rights in Malta
- Intersex civil society organizations
