= International Intersex Forum =

Annual intersex event

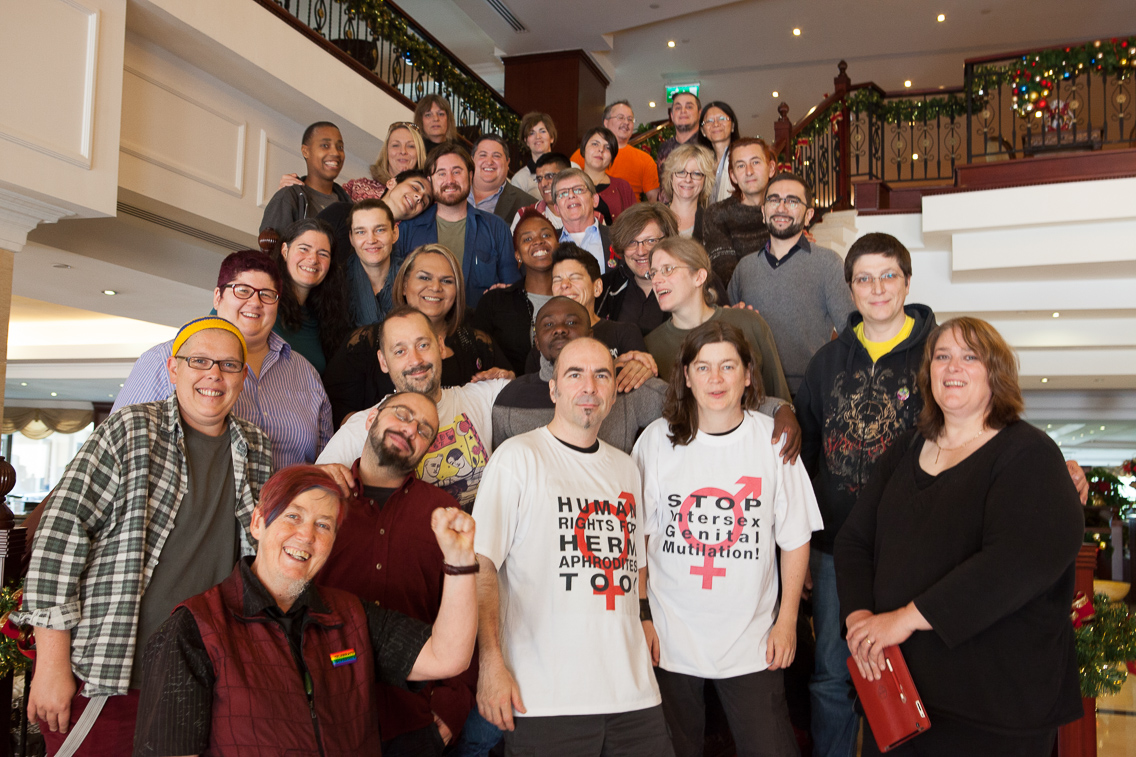
Third International Intersex Forum, Malta, December 2013

The International Intersex Forum is an annual event organised, then later supported, by the ILGA and ILGA-Europe that and organisations from multiple regions of the world, and it is believed to be the first and only such intersex event.

== Predecessor gatherings ==
The International Intersex Forum is preceded by several other smaller gatherings, including an ISNA retreat in 1996 that brought together activists from North America and New Zealand, and also a summer school organised by OII-France in 2006. The retreat is documented in a short movie entitled Hermaphrodites Speak and the film Intersexion, and the summer school in a book, A qui appartiennent nos corps? Féminisme et luttes intersexes.

== First international intersex forum, Brussels, September 2011 ==
This event, described as "historic" brought together 24 people from 17 intersex organisations to create a new informal network and agree a closing statement. The statement reads:

Around the world intersex individuals are being subjected to inhumane and degrading altering surgical and hormonal procedures, without consent of the intersex person, at the discretion of doctors and outside legal regulation. This is done to ‘normalise’ genitals and bodies in order to fit intersex people within the sex binary of men and women. Pathologisation of intersex individuals results in gross human rights violations and abuse bodily integrity and personal dignity.

The Forum agreed on the demands aiming to end discrimination against intersex people and to ensure the right of bodily integrity and self determination:

1. To put an end to mutilating and ‘normalising’ practices such as genital surgeries, psychological and other medical treatments, including infanticide and selective abortion (on the grounds of intersex) in some parts of the world.
2. To insure that the personal, free, prior, and fully informed consent of the intersex individual is a compulsory requirement in all medical practices and protocols.
3. Creating and facilitating supportive, safe and celebratory environments for intersex people, their families and surroundings.

Spokespeople for the first forum were Sally Gross of Intersex South Africa, Hiker Chiu of Oii-Chinese, Gina Wilson of Organisation Intersex International Australia, Del LaGrace Volcano, Mauro Cabral and Jim Ambrose, alongside ILGA and ILGA-Europe representatives Ruth Baldacchino and Silvan Agius.

== Second Forum, Stockholm, December 2012 ==
This forum brought together 37 activists who represented 33 intersex organisations and institutions, selected from an open call application process managed by ILGA and ILGA Europe. The participants made a series of "demands aiming to end discrimination against intersex people and to ensure the right of bodily autonomy and self-determination", including ending infanticide, terminations of intersex fetuses, ending "normalising" surgeries and providing human and citizenship rights: Countries represented included Argentina, Australia, Canada, France, Germany, Taiwan, Tunisia, Uganda and the US.

1. To put an end to mutilating and ‘normalising’ practices such as genital surgeries, psychological and other medical treatments, including infanticide and selective abortion (on the grounds of intersex).
2. To ensure that the personal, free, prior, and fully informed consent of the intersex individual is a compulsory requirement in all medical practices and protocols.
3. Creating and facilitating supportive, safe and celebratory environments for intersex people, their families and surroundings.
4. In view of ensuring the bodily integrity and health of the intersex child, psycho-social support and non-pathologising peer support be provided to parents and/or care providers and the child`s immediate family instead of surgical or other medical treatment unless such interventions are live-saving.
5. The provision of all human rights and citizenship rights to intersex people.
6. The provision of access to one`s own medical records and any documentation, and the affirmation of the intersex person's right to truth.
7. The acknowledgement and redress of the suffering and injustice caused in the past.

The Forum also, upon suggestion of author and activist Hida Viloria then global Chair of the Organisation Intersex International and founder of Intersex Campaign for Equality, called for human rights for intersex people. This took place by presenting an open letter authored by Viloria and sent on behalf of signing participants at the Forum to United Nations High Commissioner for Human Rights, Navi Pillay. The first European intersex NGO, OII Europe, was founded at the event.

== Third Forum, Malta, November–December 2013 ==
The third forum was held in Malta with 34 people representing 30 organisations "from all continents". The Malta declaration, the closing statement, affirmed the existence of intersex people, reaffirmed "the principles of the First and Second International Intersex Fora and extend the demands aiming to end discrimination against intersex people and to ensure the right of bodily integrity, physical autonomy and self-determination". For the first time, participants made a statement on birth registrations, in addition to other human rights issues:

- To put an end to mutilating and ‘normalising’ practices such as genital surgeries, psychological and other medical treatments through legislative and other means. Intersex people must be empowered to make their own decisions affecting own bodily integrity, physical autonomy and self-determination.
- To put an end to preimplantation genetic diagnosis, pre-natal screening and treatment, and selective abortion of intersex foetuses.
- To put an end to infanticide and killings of intersex people.
- To put an end to non-consensual sterilisation of intersex people.
- To depathologise variations in sex characteristics in medical guidelines, protocols and classifications, such as the World Health Organization's International Classification of Diseases.
- To register intersex children as females or males, with the awareness that, like all people, they may grow up to identify with a different sex or gender.
- To ensure that sex or gender classifications are amendable through a simple administrative procedure at the request of the individuals concerned. All adults and capable minors should be able to choose between female (F), male (M), non-binary or multiple options. In the future, as with race or religion, sex or gender should not be a category on birth certificates or identification documents for anybody.
- To raise awareness around intersex issues and the rights of intersex people in society at large.
- To create and facilitate supportive, safe and celebratory environments for intersex people, their families and surroundings.
- To ensure that intersex people have the right to full information and access to their own medical records and history.
- To ensure that all professionals and healthcare providers that have a specific role to play in intersex people's wellbeing are adequately trained to provide quality services.
- To provide adequate acknowledgement of the suffering and injustice caused to intersex people in the past, and provide adequate redress, reparation, access to justice and the right to truth.
- To build intersex anti-discrimination legislation in addition to other grounds, and to ensure protection against intersectional discrimination.
- To ensure the provision of all human rights and citizenship rights to intersex people, including the right to marry and form a family.
- To ensure that intersex people are able to participate in competitive sport, at all levels, in accordance with their legal sex. Intersex athletes who have been humiliated or stripped of their titles should receive reparation and reinstatement.
- Recognition that medicalization and stigmatisation of intersex people result in significant trauma and mental health concerns.
- In view of ensuring the bodily integrity and well-being of intersex people, autonomous non-pathologising psycho-social and peer support be available to intersex people throughout their life (as self-required), as well as to parents and/or care providers.

The forum called on:

1. International, regional and national human rights institutions to take on board, and provide visibility to intersex issues in their work.
2. National governments to address the concerns raised by the Intersex Forum and draw adequate solutions in direct collaboration with intersex representatives and organisations.
3. Media agencies and sources to ensure intersex people's right to privacy, dignity, accurate and ethical representation.
4. Funders to engage with intersex organisations and support them in the struggle for visibility, increase their capacity, the building of knowledge and the affirmation of their human rights.
5. Human rights organisations to contribute to build bridges with intersex organisations and build a basis for mutual support. This should be done in a spirit of collaboration and no-one should instrumentalise intersex issues as a means for other ends.

The Forum was organized by ILGA Europe's Silvan Agius and Ruth Baldacchino, and three intersex activists selected from an open call application process managed by ILGA Europe: Mauro Cabral, of Argentina, Mani Bruce Mitchell, of New Zealand, and Hida Viloria of OII-USA (now Intersex Campaign for Equality). Attending participants included Sean Saifa Wall and Pidgeon Pagonis for AIC (now interACT), Morgan Carpenter and Tony Briffa from Organisation Intersex International Australia, Intersex Austria Holly Greenberry from Intersex UK, Miriam van der Have and Inge Intven of Nederlandse Netwerk Intersekse/DSD (NNID), and representatives of Zwischengeschlecht, and IVIM/OII Deutschland.

== Fourth Forum, Amsterdam, April 2017 ==
The Fourth Forum took place in Amsterdam in April 2017, followed by publication of a media statement. Forty participants, including representatives of intersex organizations and independent advocates, came from all continents, including Africa, Asia, Europe, Post-Soviet countries, Latin America and the Caribbean, North America, and Oceania. The Forum affirmed the Malta declaration by the Third Forum, and called for a Fifth Forum to take place in Global South.

== Regional fora and statements ==
Between 2017 and 2018, a series of regional fora were held:

- In March 2017, Australian and New Zealand intersex organizations and activists published a regional consensus "Darlington Statement", calling for legal reform, including the criminalization of deferrable intersex medical interventions on children, an end to legal classification of sex, and improved access to peer support.
- Following a European conference in March, the "Vienna Statement" was published. It called for an end to human rights violations, and recognition of rights to bodily integrity, physical autonomy and self-determination.
- In December 2017, African intersex activists published a Statement setting out local demands, adding a call to end infanticide and killings due to traditional and religious beliefs.
- In February 2018, Asian intersex activists published the "Statement of Intersex Asia and the Asian Intersex Forum", setting out local demands, including a call to end infanticide, abandonment and honor killings.
- In April 2018, Latin American and Caribbean intersex activists published the "San José de Costa Rica statement", defining local demands and including an acknowledgement of "all the ways in which our experiences have been historically and repeatedly colonized, from the invasion of our lands to that of our bodies".

== See also ==
- Intersex
- Intersex human rights
- Intersex civil society organizations
