= Kimberly Zieselman =

Intersex activist

- Occupations: Attorney; Author
- Known for: Intersex advocacy, executive director of interACT
- Website: xoxykz.com

Kimberly Zieselman is an attorney, human rights advocate, author, and intersex woman, with androgen insensitivity syndrome. She currently serves as executive director of interACT (formerly Advocates for Informed Choice), and is a signatory of the Yogyakarta Principles plus 10. In 2020, her memoir XOXY was published.

== Early life and medical treatment ==
Zieselman has described how, at age 15 and because she hadn't menstruated, she was referred to a reproductive oncologist at Massachusetts General Hospital, a teaching hospital, and told that her ovaries and uterus needed to be removed to eliminate a risk of cancer. She had surgery at age 16, requiring a subsequent dependence on hormone replacement therapy. Neither Zieselman nor her parents were told the truth about her diagnosis, that she had androgen insensitivity syndrome, XY sex chromosomes, and internal testes.

Zieselman discovered her medical records at age 41, including a statement that she and her parents had consented to surgery after full disclosure of a diagnosis. She described being informed she was having "a hysterectomy to remove partially developed female reproductive organs that might become cancerous in the future". Discovery was disorientating, challenging her identity and that of her husband. Zieselman has also described how "I felt free when I found out".

== Career ==
Zieselman trained as a lawyer, and worked in the field of family law and assisted reproductive technology.

=== Intersex advocacy ===
In 2009, Zieselman discovered the peer support group AIS-DSD Support Group, and she later became a member of the board. Zieselman is now executive director of interACT, an organization that promotes the rights of intersex youth, including through law and policy, development of youth leadership, and media work.

The main goal of interACT is to end medically unnecessary surgeries on intersex children. Zieselman describes how intersex children just have a different type of body, and genital surgeries are not medical or social emergencies. Zieselman describes how shame and secrecy, and medically unnecessary surgeries on intersex infants causes devastating physical and psychological harm, but they take place for sociological reasons. She calls for a moratorium on surgeries until children are old enough to choose for themselves, with parents given a "full spectrum of choices".

Zieselman is quoted by the United Nations Human Rights Office in New York stating:

Doctors often claim there's a "silent majority" of intersex people satisfied with the way they were treated as young patients. I used to be part of that "silent majority" - but I certainly wasn't happy. Doctors draw this false conclusion because most of their young patients haven't returned as adults to complain. But their silence is just as likely to be caused by stigma and shame.

Zieselman has described how the LGBT community has helped open doors, but how intersex rights are broader: "at its core this is a children's rights issue. It is also about health and reproductive rights, because these operations can lead to infertility". She has described the MTV series Faking It as ground-breaking, and the public disclosure by model Hanne Gaby Odiele of their intersex trait as a tipping point for the intersex movement.

Zieselman is a signatory of the Yogyakarta Principles plus 10, on the application of international human rights law in relation to sexual orientation, gender identity, gender expression and sex characteristics.

=== Memoir ===
In 2020, her memoir XOXY was published. Chicago Review of Books described the memoir as an "impressive introduction to the powerhouse that is Kimberly M. Zieselman" that "carries the weight of what it means to be a first", showing "both the complexity and the ordinariness of intersex experiences". Los Angeles Review of Books described the book as a "gripping journey she takes readers on as she slowly unravels the truth of her identity as an intersex woman", "written with the sharp, unflinching and often hilarious prose of a woman on a mission to be her authentic self". In discussion with the Los Angeles Review of Books, Zieselman describes the memoir as about empowerment.

The book received the Stonewall Honor Books in Non-Fiction Award in 2021.

== Selected bibliography ==
Selected publications include:

- Zieselman, Kimberly M (2020). XOXY a memoir (intersex woman, mother, activist). Jessica Kingsley Publishers. ISBN 978-1-78450-990-3.
- Zieselman, Kimberly (2015). "Invisible Harm". Narrative Inquiry in Bioethics. 5 (2): 122–125. doi:10.1353/nib.2015.0056. PMID 26300143. S2CID 44624517.
- Zieselman, Kimberly (August 9, 2017). "I was an intersex child who had surgery. Don't put other kids through this". USA Today.

== Personal life ==
Zieselman is married to Steven. They are parents of adopted twin girls.

== See also ==
- interACT
- Intersex rights in the United States
