= Pidgeon Pagonis =

American activist, writer, artist, and consultant

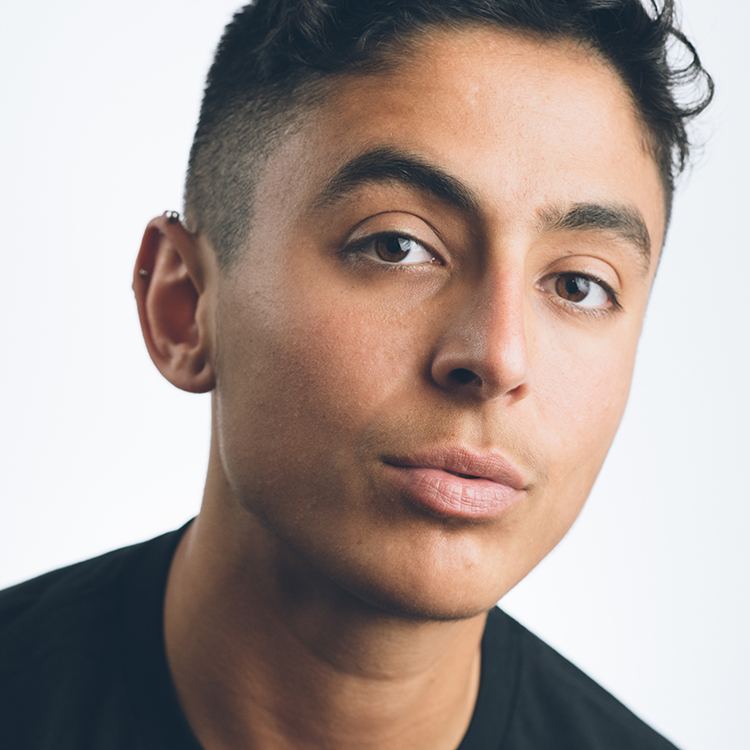
- Born: 1986 (age 39–40); Chicago, Illinois, US
- Education: DePaul University
- Occupations: Activist; Writer; Artist
- Known for: Intersex activism
- Website: pidgeonismy.name

Pidgeon Pagonis (born 1986) is an American intersex activist, writer, artist, and consultant. They are an advocate for intersex human rights and against nonconsensual intersex medical interventions.

== Early life and education ==
Pagonis was born in 1986 in Chicago, Illinois, and has Mexican and Greek ancestry. As a child, Pagonis, a queer and non-binary person who uses they/them pronouns, was diagnosed with androgen insensitivity syndrome (AIS). They were not told of this intersex variation, were assigned female at birth, told that they had ovarian cancer (when they in fact had internal testes and no ovaries), and subjected to a series of cosmetic surgeries to remove sections of their genitalia, which their doctors justified as being necessary to facilitate "sexual relationships with men."

They learned about intersex traits during their freshman year in college, while attending a lecture at DePaul University. They subsequently accessed their own medical records, and learned the truth about their variation. In 2020, they learned that their AIS diagnosis was incorrect and that they have another intersex variation known as NR-5A1, as their low levels of estrogen and osteopenia might have indicated.

Pagonis graduated from DePaul with bachelor's and master's degrees in women and gender studies.

== Activism ==
Pagonis joined the advocacy organization interACT a few years after discovering they were intersex. They became the leadership coordinator of the youth program at interACT. In 2013, Pagonis testified with Mauro Cabral, Natasha Jiménez and Paula Sandrine Machado before the Inter-American Commission on Human Rights about the medical interventions they were subjected to as an intersex child. They were also featured in the 2012 documentary Intersexion.

In 2014, Pagonis created a documentary of their own, The Son They Never Had: Growing Up Intersex, which they tour around the country, advocating against nonconsensual "corrective surgeries". This work was published in a bioethics journal, Narrative Inquiry in Bioethics. The Son They Never Had was also shown at the Leeds Queer Film Festival in the UK in March 2017.

In 2015, Pagonis created the hashtag campaign #intersexstories for Intersex Awareness Day. The campaign attracted a huge following, with many intersex people sharing their stories. Pagonis also appeared in a BuzzFeed video about intersex bodies, identities and experiences.

Pagonis is a writer for Everyday Feminism, where they have addressed subjects including anti-black racism in the intersex community, interviewing Sean Saifa Wall and Lynnell Stephani Long, and debate over the inclusion of intersex people in the LGBTQA acronym.

Pagonis appeared in a 2016 episode of the television series Transparent. Pagonis’ supervisor and the coordinator for interACT, Kimberly Zeiselman, nominated them for the role. They lobbied for the part when meeting show creator Joey Soloway at a White House awards ceremony. Pagonis was featured in season 3, episode 1 of Transparent and made a cameo as the intersex character of Baxter to increase the representation of intersex people. The role of Baxter involves them working as a volunteer at the Los Angeles LGBT Center hotline along with Maura. In the episode “Elizah,” Baxter is introduced and mentions both the phrase “ambiguous genitalia” as well as referencing the Oprah episode on intersexuality. Pagonis cites the reason for participating in Transparent as creating “a positive instance of representation” for intersex people, increasing the “notoriety” of the intersex movement. The episode was acclaimed and had a positive impact on the visibility of the intersex community, with season 3 of Transparent being considered possibly the most ambitious season by critics. Pagonis considers this role to be a way of advocating for human rights.

Pagonis appeared on the cover of the January 2017 National Geographic "Gender Revolution" issue. They were one of the intersex activists who wrote in expressing concern that being intersex was defined by the magazine as a disorder. National Geographic responded to reader pressure by updating the definition in the online issue.

In June 2017, Pagonis appeared in a video for Teen Vogue alongside fellow intersex advocates Emily Quinn and Hanne Gaby Odiele, explaining what it means to be intersex.

Pagonis also co-founded the Chicago-based Intersex Justice Project with activists Sean Saifa Wall and Lynnell Stephani Long. Wall and Pagonis organized protests and demonstrations outside of Lurie Children's Hospital, where Pagonis was operated on as a child. Intersex Justice Project carried forth the #endintersexsurgery campaign against Lurie for three years. On July 28, 2020, Lurie Children's Hospital issued a formal public apology to intersex patients for past surgeries and ceased performing cosmetic surgeries on infants, becoming the first hospital in the United States to do.

In May 2021, Pagonis reported that for the second time the intersex hashtag was removed on TikTok and demanded its return. A poster could not click the tag on their own post and trying to search for intersex pulled up a “null” page. TikTok told The Verge that in both of the instances Pagonis noticed, the tag had been removed by mistake and was subsequently restored. But because there was no public statement about the accidental removal, Pagonis and others were left to speculate about whether it was being intentionally censored.

After growing up with secrecy, lies, and shame surrounding their intersex identity, Pagonis views TikTok and similar platforms as spaces where intersex people “can connect with each other and also advocate for ourselves and each other, and then other people can learn about intersex.”

But when the easiest way to discover intersex content on TikTok disappears, that erasure follows the historical mistreatment of intersex people. “My community is erased with a scalpel, and with words and linguistics,” said Pagonis, “but this time they're literally erasing the word.”

In 2023, they published a memoir titled Nobody Needs to Know.

== Awards and recognition ==
Pagonis was one of nine LGBT artists honored as an Obama White House Champion of Change in 2015. They were also one of "30 Under 30" honored by the Windy City Times in 2013.

== Selected bibliography ==
- Pagonis, Pidgeon (August 15, 2023). Nobody Needs To Know: A Memoir. Topple. ISBN 978-1542029469.
- Pagonis, Pidgeon (April 2017). "First Do Harm: How Intersex Kids Are Hurt by those Who Have Taken the Hippocratic Oath". Griffith Journal of Law & Human Dignity. 5 (1): 40–51. doi:10.69970/gjlhd.v5i0.915. ISSN 2203-3114.
- Pagonis, Pidgeon (August 2016). "6 Free or Affordable Tips for Intersex People Trying to Get By". Everyday Feminism.
- Davis, Georgiann; Pagonis, Pidgeon (August 2016). "Bias Against Intersex Olympics Athletes Is What's Unfair – Not These Athletes' Bodies". Everyday Feminism.
- Pagonis, Pidgeon (June 2016). "6 Things Intersex Folks Need to Know About How We Perpetuate Anti-Black Racism". Everyday Feminism.
- Pagonis, Pidgeon (June 2016). "7 Ways Adding 'I' to the LGBTQA+ Acronym Can Miss the Point". Everyday Feminism.
- Pagonis, Pidgeon (2015). "The Son They Never Had". Narrative Inquiry in Bioethics. 5 (2): 103–106. doi:10.1353/nib.2015.0053. PMID 26300136. S2CID 45960304.

== See also ==
- Intersex rights in the United States
- Intersex human rights
- Intersex medical interventions
