= Ana S. Iltis =

American philosopher

Education
- Education: Villanova University (B.A. in Philosophy) Villanova University (B.A. in Honors Interdisciplinary Arts and Sciences) Rice University (M.A.) Rice University (Ph.D.)

Philosophical work
- Era: 21st-century philosophy
- Region: Western philosophy
- Institutions: Wake Forest College
- Main interests: bioethics

Ana Lucia Smith Iltis is an American philosopher, Carlson Professor of University Studies and Director of the Center for Bioethics, Health, and Society at Wake Forest College. She is also a former associate professor at Saint Louis University. Her research dives into ethical issues relating to organ donation, transplantation, human genome editing, and the relationship between ancestry,race, and genetics with kidney transplantation. She is known for her works on bioethics. Iltis is a co-editor of Narrative Inquiry in Bioethics and a former president of the American Society for Bioethics and Humanities (2019–21).

== Works ==
In 2010 Ana S. Iltis published an article "Toward a Coherent Account of Pediatric Decision Making" in The Journal of Medicine and Philosophy: A Forum for Bioethics and Philosophy of Medicine.

In 2019 Ana S. Iltis, Kirstin R.W. Matthews, and Daniel S. Wagner published a series of reports as a part of the grant “Drawing the Line: Assessing and Analyzing the U.S. Rule on Embryo Research from Ethical, Political, and Scientific Perspectives,” which was funded by The Greenwall Foundation (a private organization working to promote bioethics in healthcare policy, research, and clinical decision-making).

In 2024 Ana S. Iltis edited The Oxford Handbook of Research Ethics, which was published by The Oxford University Press. Iltis was inspired to work on this project because she, "saw it as an incredible opportunity to think conceptually about an area I'm passionate about."

Iltis won the 2026 Paul Ramsey Award for Excellence in Bioethics. The award is given by the Center for Bioethics and Culture and the Paul Ramsey Award Committee.
