= Intersex =

Atypical congenital variations of sex characteristics

External videos
- " What It's Like To Be Intersex", Lizz Warner, BuzzFeed

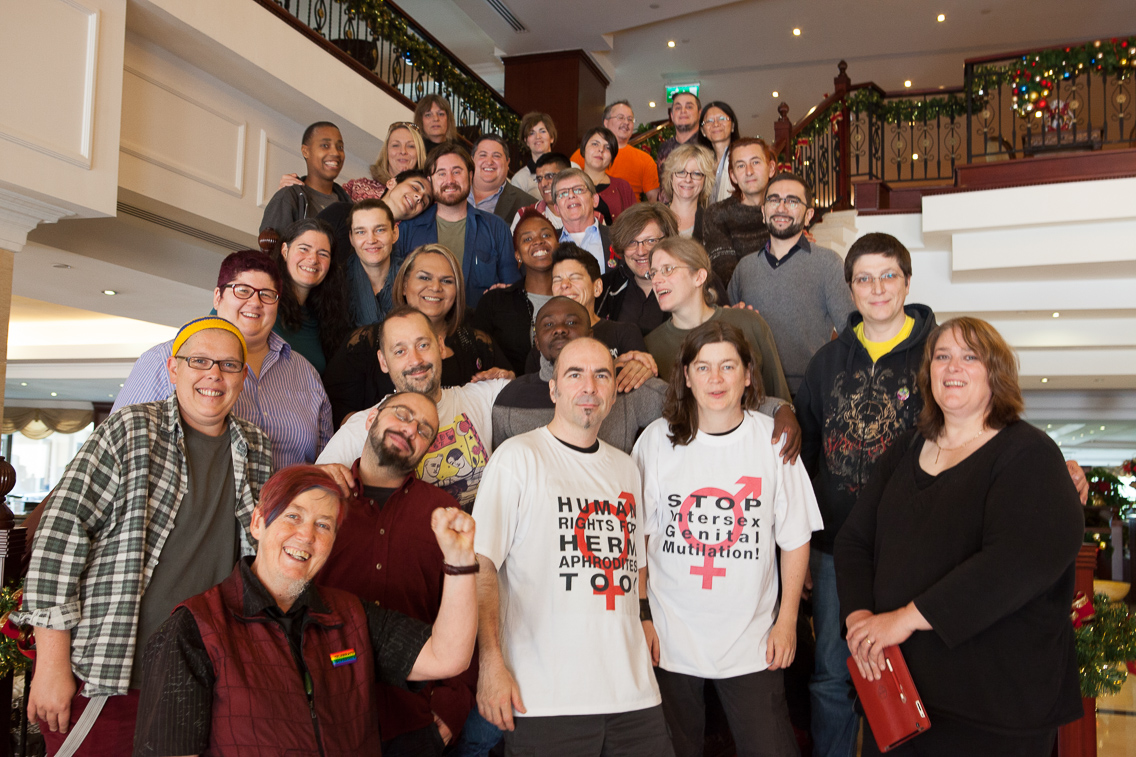
Participants at the third International Intersex Forum, Malta, in December 2013

Intersex people are those born with any of several sex characteristics, including chromosome patterns, gonads, or genitals that, according to the Office of the United Nations High Commissioner for Human Rights, "do not fit typical binary notions of male or female bodies". The opposite of intersex is endosex, which describes persons born with sex characteristics that are seen as typically male or female at birth.

Sex assignment at birth usually aligns with a child's external genitalia. The number of births with ambiguous genitals is in the range of 1:4,500–1:2,000 (0.02%–0.05%). Other conditions involve the development of atypical chromosomes, gonads, or hormones. The portion of the population that is intersex has been reported differently depending on which definition of intersex is used and which conditions are included. Estimates often range from 0.018% (one in 5,500 births) to 1.7%. The difference centers on whether conditions in which chromosomal sex matches a phenotypic sex which is clearly identifiable as male or female, such as late onset congenital adrenal hyperplasia (1.5 percentage points) and Klinefelter syndrome, should be counted as intersex. Some intersex people identify with a gender different from their assigned sex, though this is not exclusive to intersex people.

Terms used to describe intersex people are contested, and change over time and place. Intersex people were previously referred to as "hermaphrodites" or "congenital eunuchs". In the 19th and 20th centuries, some medical experts devised new nomenclature in an attempt to classify the characteristics that they had observed, the first attempt to create a taxonomic classification system of intersex conditions. Intersex people were categorized as either having "true hermaphroditism", "female pseudohermaphroditism", or "male pseudohermaphroditism". These terms are no longer used, and terms including the word "hermaphrodite" are considered to be misleading, stigmatizing, and scientifically specious when applied to humans. In biology, the term "hermaphrodite" is used to describe an organism that can produce both male and female gametes. Some people with intersex traits use the term "intersex", and some prefer other language. In clinical settings, the term "disorders of sex development" (DSD) has been used since 2006, a shift in language considered controversial since its introduction.

Intersex people face stigmatization and discrimination from birth, or following the discovery of intersex traits at stages of development such as puberty. Intersex people may face infanticide, abandonment, and stigmatization from their families. Globally, some intersex infants and children, such as those with ambiguous outer genitalia, are surgically or hormonally altered to create more socially acceptable sex characteristics. This is considered controversial, with no firm evidence of favorable outcomes. Such treatments may involve sterilization. Adults, including elite female athletes, have also been subjects of such treatment. Increasingly, these issues are considered human rights abuses, with statements from international and national human rights and ethics institutions. Intersex organizations have also issued statements about human rights violations, including the 2013 Malta declaration of the third International Intersex Forum. In 2011, Christiane Völling became the first intersex person known to have successfully sued for damages in a case brought for non-consensual surgical intervention. In April 2015, Malta became the first country to outlaw non-consensual medical interventions to modify sex anatomy, including that of intersex people.

== Terminology ==
There is no clear consensus definition of intersex and no clear delineation of which specific conditions qualify an individual as intersex. The World Health Organization's International Classification of Diseases (ICD), the American Psychiatric Association's Diagnostic and Statistical Manual of Mental Disorders (DSM), and many medical journals classify intersex traits or conditions among disorders of sex development (DSD).

=== Etymology and definitions ===
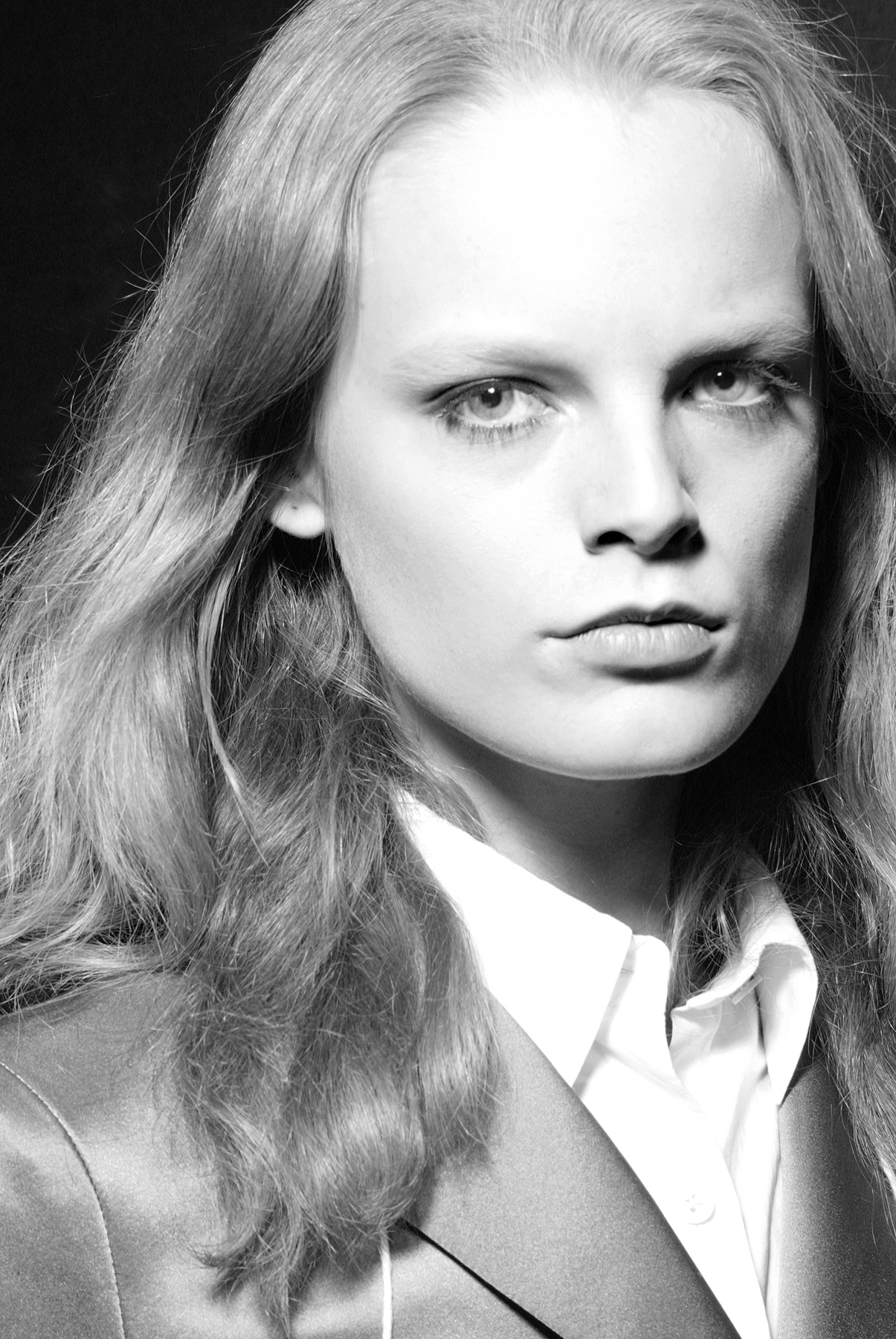
Model Hanne Gaby Odiele photographed by Ed Kavishe for Fashionwirepress. In 2017, Odiele disclosed having the intersex trait androgen insensitivity syndrome.

In 1917, Richard Goldschmidt created the term "intersexuality" to refer to a variety of physical sex ambiguities. However, according to The SAGE Encyclopedia of LGBTQ Studies, it was not until Anne Fausto Sterling published her article "The Five Sexes: Why Male and Female Are Not Enough" in 1993 that the term reached popularity.

According to the UN Office of the High Commissioner for Human Rights:

Intersex people are born with sex characteristics (such as sexual anatomy, reproductive organs, hormonal patterns and/or chromosomal patterns) that do not fit typical binary notions of male or female bodies.

=== Attitudes towards the term ===
Some intersex organizations reference "intersex people" and "intersex variations or traits" while others use more medicalized language such as "people with intersex conditions", or people "with intersex conditions or DSDs (differences of sex development)" and "children born with variations of sex anatomy". In May 2016, interACT published a statement recognizing "increasing general understanding and acceptance of the term 'intersex'".

Australian sociological research on 272 "people born with atypical sex characteristics", published in 2016, found that 60% of respondents used the term "intersex" to self-describe their sex characteristics, including people identifying themselves as intersex, describing themselves as having an intersex variation or, in smaller numbers, having an intersex condition. Respondents also commonly used diagnostic labels and referred to their sex chromosomes, with word choices depending on audience.

Research on 202 respondents by the Lurie Children's Hospital, Chicago, and the AIS-DSD Support Group (now known as InterConnect Support Group) published in 2017 found that 80% of Support Group respondents "strongly liked, liked or felt neutral about intersex" as a term, while caregivers were less supportive. The hospital reported that the use of the term "disorders of sex development" may negatively affect care.

Another study by a group of children's hospitals in the United States found that 53% of 133 parent and adolescent participants recruited at five clinics did not like the term "intersex". Participants who were members of support groups were more likely to dislike the term. A "dsd-LIFE" study in 2020 found that around 43% of 179 participants thought the term "intersex" was bad, 20% felt neutral about the term, while 37% thought the term was good.

=== The term "hermaphrodite" ===
Historically, the term "hermaphrodite" was used in law to refer to people whose sex was in doubt. The 12th century Decretum Gratiani states that "Whether an hermaphrodite may witness a testament, depends on which sex prevails" ("Hermafroditus an ad testamentum adhiberi possit, qualitas sexus incalescentis ostendit"). Similarly, the 17th century English jurist and judge Edward Coke (Lord Coke), wrote in his Institutes of the Lawes of England on laws of succession stating, "Every heire is either a male, a female, or an hermaphrodite, that is both male and female. And an hermaphrodite (which is also called Androgynus) shall be heire, either as male or female, according to that type of sexe which doth prevaile."

During the Victorian era, medical authors attempted to ascertain whether or not humans could be hermaphrodites, adopting a precise biological definition for the term, and making distinctions between "male pseudohermaphrodite", "female pseudohermaphrodite" and especially "true hermaphrodite". These terms, which reflected histology (microscopic appearance) of the gonads, are rarely used in the 2020s. Until the mid-20th century, "hermaphrodite" was used synonymously with "intersex". Medical terminology shifted in the early 21st century, driven both by concerns about language and by a turn toward understanding based on genetics. The term "hermaphrodite" is also controversial as it implies the existence of someone fully male and fully female. As such the term "hermaphrodite" is often seen as degrading, although many intersex activists use it as a direct form of self empowerment and critique such as in the Intersex Society of North America's (ISNA) first newsletter Hermaphrodites with Attitude.

The Intersex Society of North America has stated that hermaphrodites should not be confused with intersex people and that using "hermaphrodite" to refer to intersex individuals is considered to be stigmatizing and misleading.

== Prevalence ==
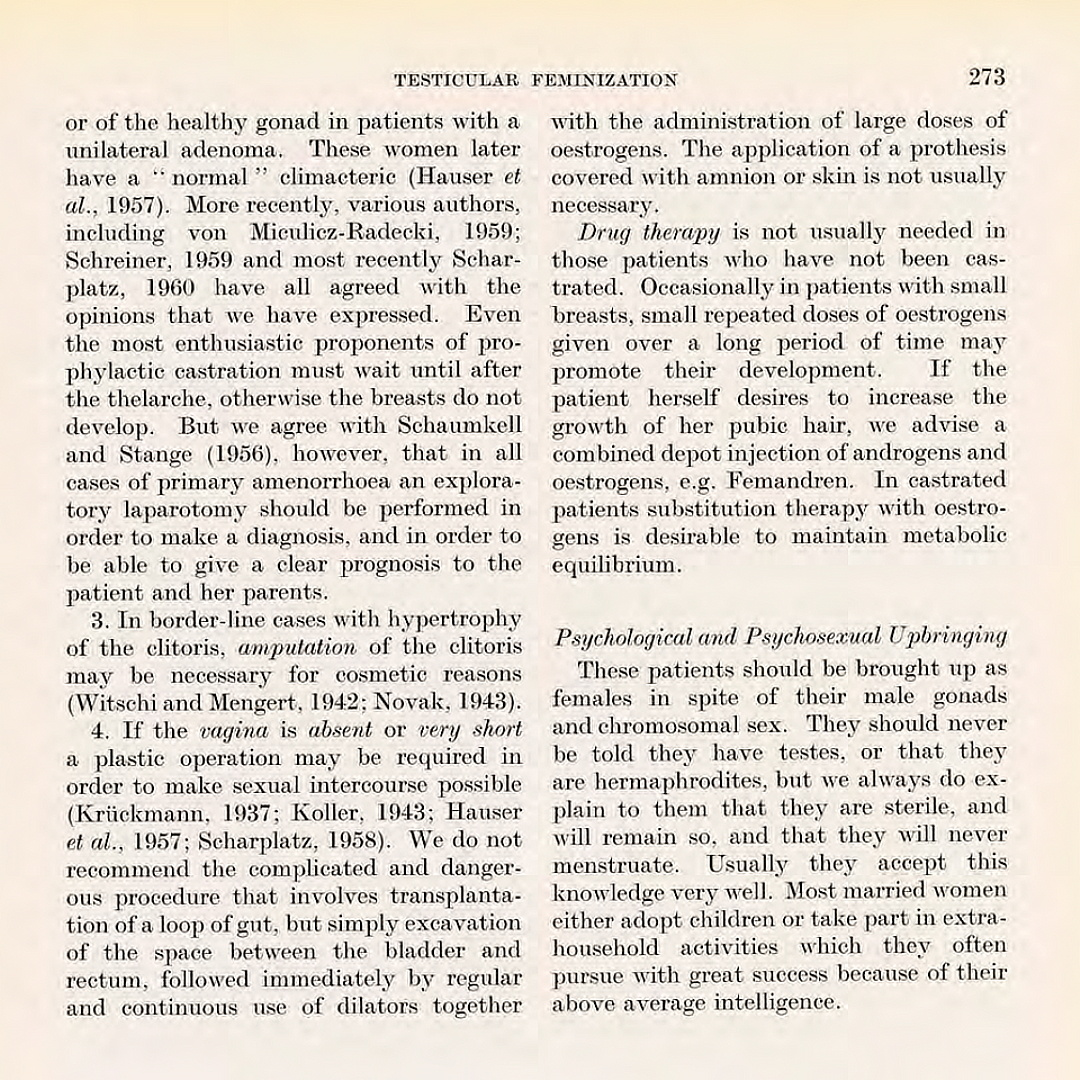
The standard treatment in cases of androgen insensitivity syndrome and other intersex conditions was to lie to patients. This extract is from a book published in 1963.

Estimates of the number of people who are intersex vary, depending on which conditions are counted as intersex. The now-defunct Intersex Society of North America said:

If you ask experts at medical centers how often a child is born so noticeably atypical in terms of genitalia that a specialist in sex differentiation is called in, the number comes out to about 1 in 1,500 to 1 in 2,000 births [0.07–0.05%]. But a lot more people than that are born with subtler forms of sex anatomy variations, some of which won't show up until later in life.

Anne Fausto-Sterling et al., said in 2000 that "[a]dding the estimates of all known causes of nondimorphic sexual development suggests that approximately 1.7% of all live births do not conform to a Platonic ideal of absolute sex chromosome, gonadal, genital, and hormonal dimorphism"; these publications have been widely quoted by intersex activists. Of the 1.7%, 1.5% points (88% of those considered "nondimorphic sexual development" in this figure) consist of individuals with late onset congenital adrenal hyperplasia (LOCAH) which may be asymptomatic but can present after puberty and cause infertility.

Leonard Sax, in response to Fausto-Sterling, estimated that the prevalence of intersex was about 0.018% of the world's population, discounting several conditions included in Fausto-Sterling's estimate that included LOCAH, Klinefelter syndrome (47,XXY), Turner syndrome (45,X), the chromosomal variants of 47,XYY and 47,XXX, and vaginal agenesis. Sax reasons that in these conditions chromosomal sex is consistent with phenotypic sex and phenotype is classifiable as either male or female.

In a 2003 letter to the editor, political scientist Carrie Hull analyzed the data used by Fausto-Sterling and said the estimated intersex rate should instead have been 0.37%, due to many errors. In a response letter published simultaneously, Fausto-Sterling welcomed the additional analysis and said "I am not invested in a particular final estimate, only that there BE an estimate." A 2018 review reported that the number of births with ambiguous genitals is in the range of 0.02% to 0.05%.

Intersex Human Rights Australia says it maintains 1.7% as its preferred upper limit "despite its flaws", stating both that the estimate "encapsulates the entire population of people who are stigmatized—or risk stigmatization—due to innate sex characteristics", and that Sax's definitions exclude individuals who experience such stigma and who have helped to establish the intersex movement. According to InterACT, a major organization for intersex rights in the US, 1.7% of people have some variation of sexual development, 0.5% have atypical genitalia, and 0.05% have mixed/ambiguous genitalia. (Note: Sex within this context refers to the gonads, many individuals with intersex variations have an assigned sex and gender identity that differs from gonadal sex. Individuals with complete androgen insensitivity syndrome are phenotypically female, are assigned female at birth, and usually have a female gender identity but have testis. The definition of biological sex within intersex topics are often arbitrary.) A study relying on a nationally representative survey conducted in Mexico between 2021 and 2022 obtained similar estimates: around 1.6% of individuals aged 15 to 64 reported being born with sex variations. A higher estimate has been found in Chile, where 2.77% of individuals aged 15 to 64 self-identify as intersex.

The following summarizes prevalences of traits that some medical experts consider to be intersex (where sex chromosome anomalies are involved, the karyotype is often summarized by the total number of chromosomes followed by the sex chromosomes present in each cell):

Condition	Sex specificity	Approximate prevalence
Late onset congenital adrenal hyperplasia (nonclassical forms) (Note: Categorization of late onset congenital adrenal hyperplasia as an intersex condition is disputed by some experts as explained in the Prevalence section.)	Female (males are generally asymptomatic)	One in 50–1,000 births (0.1–0.2% up to 1–2% depending on population)
Hypospadias	Male	One in 200–10,000 male births (0.01%–0.5%), prevalence estimates vary considerably
Klinefelter syndrome (47, XXY)	Male	One in 500–1,000 male births (0.1–0.2%)
Trisomy X or triple X syndrome (47, XXX)	Female	One in 1,000 female births (0.10%)
Turner syndrome (45, X)	Female	One in 2,500 female births (0.04%)
Müllerian agenesis (of vagina, i.e., MRKH Syndrome)	Female	One in 4,500 female births (0.022%)
Vaginal atresia	Female	One in 5,000 female births (0.02%)
45,X/46,XY mosaicism	N/A, but usually male	One in 6,666 births (0.015%)
47, XYY syndrome	Male	One in 7,000 male births (0.0142%)
Congenital adrenal hyperplasia (classical forms)	N/A (but virilization of female infants)	One in 10,000–20,000 births (0.01–0.02%)
48, XXXY syndrome	Male	One in 50,000 male births (0.002%)
49, XXXXY syndrome	Male	One in 85,000-100,000 male births (0.001%)
48, XXYY syndrome	Male	One in 18,000–40,000 male births (0.0025%–0.0055%)
49, XXXYY syndrome	Male	Less than one in 1000000 births
XX male or de la Chapelle syndrome	Male	One in 20,000 male births (0.005%)
Ovotesticular syndrome	N/A	One in 20,000 births (0.005%)
XY gonadal dysgenesis	Phenotypic female	One in 80,000 births (0.0013%)
Androgen insensitivity syndrome (complete and partial phenotypes)	Genetic male	One in 22,000-64,000 male births (0.0045-0.001%)
Androgen deficiency	N/A	No estimate
Idiopathic intersexuality (no discernable medical cause)	N/A	One in 110,000 births (0.0009%)
Iatrogenic intersexuality (caused by medical treatment, e.g., progestogen administered to pregnant mother)	N/A	No estimate
5-alpha-reductase deficiency	Male	No estimate (Note: In the Dominican Republic, 5-alpha-reductase deficiency is not uncommon in the town of Las Salinas, resulting in social acceptance of the intersex trait. Men with the trait are called "güevedoces" (Spanish for "eggs at twelve"). 12 out of 13 families had one or more male family members that carried the gene. The overall incidence for the town was 1 in every 90 males were carriers, with other males either non-carriers or non-affected carriers.)
Aromatase excess syndrome	N/A	Less than 1 in 1,000,000
Aromatase deficiency	N/A	No estimate
Anorchia	Male	One in 20,000 male births (0.005%)
Persistent Müllerian duct syndrome	Male	No estimate
46,XX/46,XY	N/A	No estimate
Leydig cell hypoplasia	Male	One in 1,000,000 male births (0.000001%)
Gonadotropin-releasing hormone insensitivity	N/A	No estimate
Familial male-limited precocious puberty	Male	No estimate
Cytochrome P450 oxidoreductase deficiency	N/A	No estimate
Isolated 17,20-lyase deficiency	N/A	No estimate
Testicular dysgenesis syndrome	Male	No estimate
Penoscrotal transposition	Male	No estimate
Hyperandrogenism	N/A	No estimate
Hyperestrogenism	N/A	No estimate
Polyorchidism	Male	No estimate
Aphallia	Male	No estimate
Cryptorchidism	Male	One in 33–100 male births (3–1%)
Cloacal exstrophy (born with XY chromosomes)	Male	One in 400,000 live births (0.0025%)

== History ==
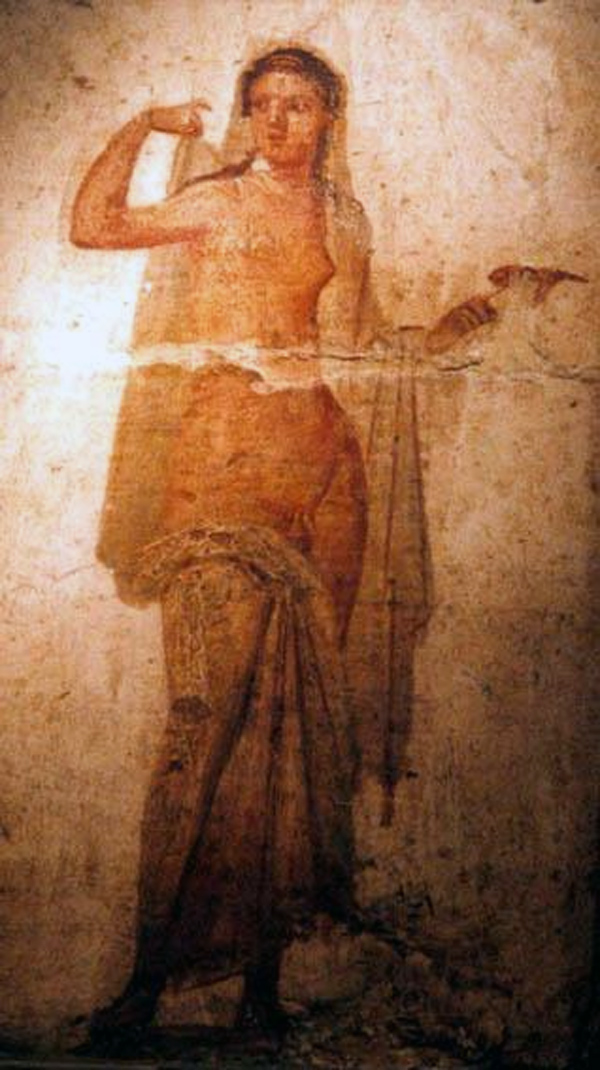
Hermaphroditus in a wall painting from Herculaneum (first half of the 1st century AD)

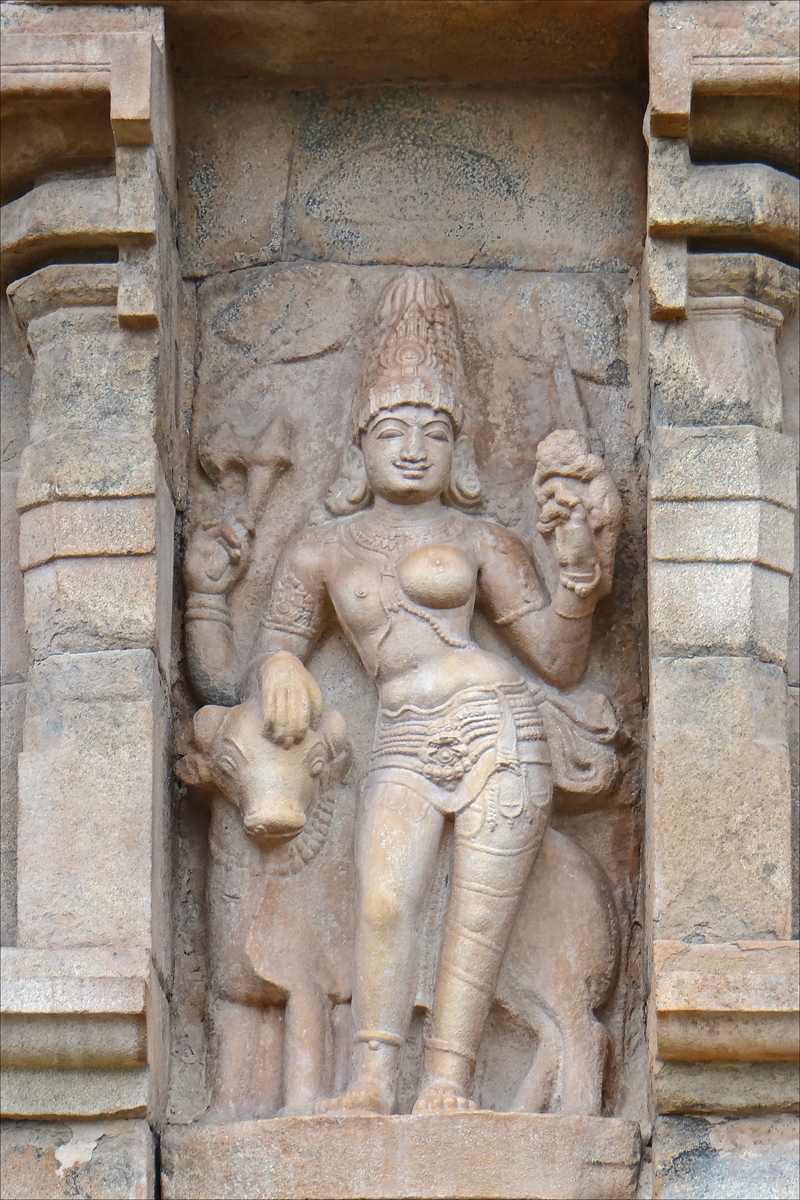
A Chola statue depicting Ardhanarishvara, a Hermaphroditus form of Shiva

From early history, societies have been aware of intersex people. Some of the earliest evidence is found in mythology: the Greek historian Diodorus Siculus wrote of the mythological Hermaphroditus in the first century BC, who was "born with a physical body which is a combination of that of a man and that of a woman", and reputedly possessed supernatural properties. He also recounted the lives of Diophantus of Abae and Callon of Epidaurus. Ardhanarishvara, an androgynous composite form of male deity Shiva and female deity Parvati, originated in Kushan culture as far back as the first century AD. A statue depicting Ardhanarishvara is included in India's Meenakshi Temple; this statue clearly shows both male and female bodily elements.

Hippocrates (c. 460 – c. 370 BC, Greek physician) and Galen (129 – c. 200/216 AD, Roman physician, surgeon, and philosopher) both viewed sex as a spectrum between men and women, with "many shades in between, including hermaphrodites, a perfect balance of male and female". Pliny the Elder (AD 23/24–79), a Roman naturalist, described "those who are born of both sexes, whom we call hermaphrodites, at one time androgyni" (from the Greek andr-, "man", and gyn-, "woman"). Augustine (354 – 430 AD), the influential Catholic theologian, wrote in The Literal Meaning of Genesis that humans were created in two sexes, despite "as happens in some births, in the case of what we call androgynes".

In medieval and early modern European societies, Roman law, post-classical canon law, and later common law, referred to a person's sex as male, female or hermaphrodite, with legal rights as male or female depending on the characteristics that appeared most dominant. The 12th century Decretum Gratiani states, "Whether an hermaphrodite may witness a testament, depends on which sex prevails." The foundation of common law, the 17th century Institutes of the Lawes of England described how a hermaphrodite could inherit "either as male or female, according to that kind of sexe which doth prevaile". Legal cases have been described in canon law and elsewhere over the centuries.

In medieval Europe, people whom learned writers called "hermaphrodites", a term which overlaps with the modern term intersex, were discussed in medical, visual, legal, and religious traditions. Some medieval anatomical theories, especially the widely circulated doctrine of the seven-celled uterus derived from pseudo-Galenic medicine, held that the position of conception within the womb could shape the sex of the child. In some versions of this model, the middle chamber was associated with the conception of a hermaphrodite. By the thirteenth and fourteenth centuries, surgeons in Italy and France claimed the authority to inspect ambiguous genital anatomy, determine which sex predominated and, in some cases, to remove or close genital tissue they viewed as contrary to a body’s natural form. These judgments could carry significant social consequences because sex classification affected marriage, inheritance, legal testimony, and eligibility for religious office. At the same time, medieval religious and alchemical writing could use the hermaphrodite in more symbolic ways: some late medieval texts employed hermaphroditic imagery to represent the union of masculine and feminine, and even described Christ in hermaphroditic terms as a way of thinking about creation.

Leah DeVun’s book The Shape of Sex: Nonbinary Gender from Genesis to the Renaissance adds to this by showing that medieval ideas about hermaphrodites were medical and religious as well as legal and philosophical. DeVun argues that “although intersex individuals were socially and textually marginalized, ideas about nonbinary sex were central to the fundamental categories that ordered the world.” This is important because medieval writers used intersex bodies to think about what counted as male, female, human, natural, or unnatural. In a 1331 Catalan marriage case discussed by DeVun, the 14th- century surgeon Vesianus Pelegrini examined Berengaria after her husband sought an annulment on the grounds that the marriage could not be consummated. The case illustrates how medical testimony could be used by courts to determine a person’s legal and marital status. DeVun connects this development to the professionalization of surgery, arguing that surgeons’ claims to classify and “correct” sex helped enforce a binary model of male and female while also strengthening surgeons’ authority over the body. So while the medieval history of intersex was connected to symbolism, it was also tied institutions like courts, medicine, marriage, and the Church.

Some non-European societies have sex or gender systems that recognize more than the two categories of male/man and female/woman. Some of these cultures, for instance the South-Asian Hijra communities, may include intersex people in a third gender category. Although—according to Morgan Holmes—early Western anthropologists categorized such cultures as "primitive", Holmes has argued that analyses of these cultures have been simplistic or romanticized and fail to take account of the ways that subjects of all categories are treated.

During the Victorian era, medical authors introduced the terms "true hermaphrodite" for an individual who has both ovarian and testicular tissue, "male pseudo-hermaphrodite" for a person with testicular tissue, but either female or ambiguous sexual anatomy, and "female pseudo-hermaphrodite" for a person with ovarian tissue, but either male or ambiguous sexual anatomy. Some later shifts in terminology have reflected advances in genetics, while other shifts are suggested to be due to pejorative associations.

The term "intersexuality" was coined by Richard Goldschmidt in 1917. The first suggestion to replace the term "hermaphrodite" with "intersex" was made by Cawadias in the 1940s.

Since the rise of modern medical science, some intersex people with ambiguous external genitalia have had their genitalia surgically modified to resemble either female or male genitals. Surgeons pinpointed intersex babies as a "social emergency" when born. An 'optimal gender policy', initially developed by John Money, stated that early intervention helped avoid gender identity confusion, but this lacks evidence. Early interventions have adverse consequences for psychological and physical health. Since advances in surgery have made it possible for intersex conditions to be concealed, many people are not aware of how frequently intersex conditions arise in human beings or that they occur at all.

Dialogue between what were once antagonistic groups of activists and clinicians has led to only slight changes in medical policies and how intersex patients and their families are treated in some locations. In 2011, Christiane Völling became the first intersex person known to have successfully sued for damages in a case brought for non-consensual surgical intervention. In April 2015, Malta became the first country to outlaw non-consensual medical interventions to modify sex anatomy, including that of intersex people. Many civil society organizations and human rights institutions now call for an end to unnecessary "normalizing" interventions, including in the Malta declaration.

== Human rights and legal issues ==
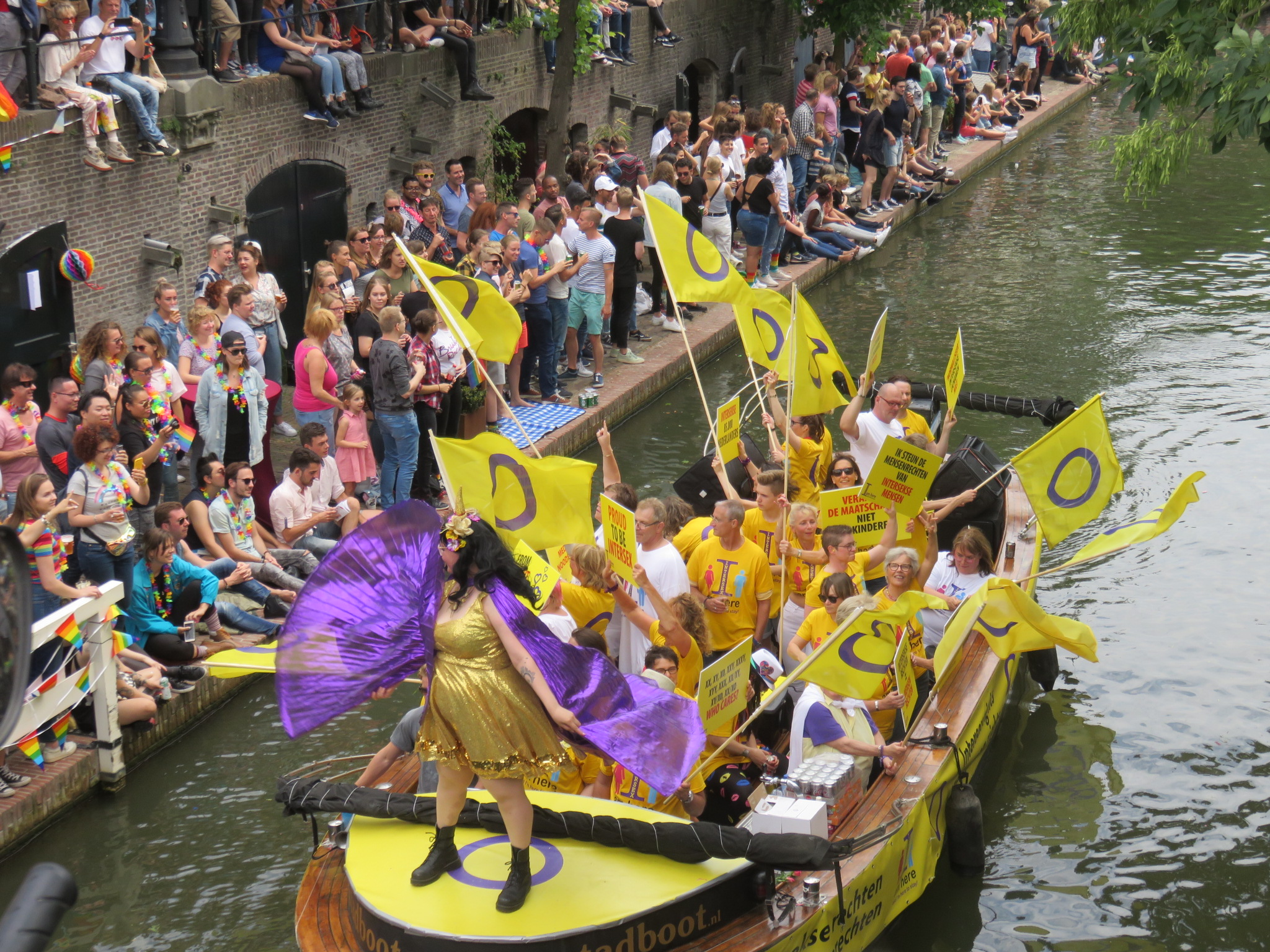
Intersex activists on a boat at Utrecht Canal Pride in the Netherlands on 16 June 2018

Human rights institutions are placing increasing scrutiny on harmful practices and issues of discrimination against intersex people. These issues have been addressed by a rapidly increasing number of international institutions including, in 2015, the Council of Europe, the United Nations Office of the United Nations High Commissioner for Human Rights and the World Health Organization (WHO). In 2024, the United Nations Human Rights Council adopted its first resolution to protect the rights of intersex people. In 2025, the Council of Europe adopted the Recommendation on Equal Rights for Intersex Persons.

These developments have been accompanied by International Intersex Forums and increased cooperation among civil society organizations. However, the implementation, codification, and enforcement of intersex human rights in national legal systems remains slow.

=== Physical integrity and bodily autonomy ===
Legal prohibition of non-consensual medical interventions Regulatory suspension or limitation of harmful practices Legal prohibition in at least one state/province Physical integrity and bodily autonomy on intersex not legislated

Stigmatization and discrimination from birth may include infanticide, abandonment, and the stigmatization of families. The birth of an intersex child was often viewed as a curse or a sign of a witch mother, especially in parts of Africa. Abandonments and infanticides have been reported in Uganda, Kenya, South Asia, and China.

Infants, children and adolescents also experience "normalising" interventions on intersex people that are medically unnecessary and the pathologisation of variations in sex characteristics. In countries where the human rights of intersex people have been studied, medical interventions to modify the sex characteristics of intersex people have still taken place without the consent of the intersex person. Interventions have been described by human rights defenders as a violation of many rights, including (but not limited to) bodily integrity, non-discrimination, privacy, and experimentation. These interventions have frequently been performed with the consent of the intersex person's parents, when the person is legally too young to consent. Such interventions have been criticized by the WHO, other UN bodies such as the Office of the High Commissioner for Human Rights, and an increasing number of regional and national institutions due to their adverse consequences, including trauma, impact on sexual function and sensation, and violation of rights to physical and mental integrity. The UN organizations decided that infant intervention should not be allowed, in favor of waiting for the child to mature enough to be a part of the decision-making—this allows for a decision to be made with total consent. In April 2015, Malta became the first country to outlaw surgical intervention without consent. In the same year, the Council of Europe became the first institution to state that intersex people have the right not to undergo sex affirmation interventions.

=== Anti-discrimination and equal treatment ===
Explicit protection on grounds of sex characteristics Explicit protection on grounds of intersex status Explicit protection on grounds of intersex within attribute of sex

People born with intersex bodies are seen as different. Intersex infants, children, adolescents and adults "are often stigmatized and subjected to multiple human rights violations", including discrimination in education, healthcare, employment, sport, and public services. Researchers have documented significant disparities in mental, physical, and sexual health when comparing intersex individuals to the general population, including higher rates of bullying, stigmatization, harassment, violence, and suicidal intention, as well as substantial barriers in the workplace. Similarly, a study from Chile estimated that intersex individuals belong to households with incomes that are substantially lower than those of endosex male individuals.

Several countries have so far explicitly protected intersex people from discrimination, with landmarks including South Africa, Australia, and, most comprehensively, Malta.

=== Remedies and claims for compensation ===
Claims for compensation and remedies for human rights abuses include the 2011 case of Christiane Völling in Germany. A second case was adjudicated in Chile in 2012, involving a child and his parents. A further successful case in Germany, taken by Michaela Raab, was reported in 2015. In the United States, the Minor Child (M.C. v Aaronson) lawsuit was "a medical malpractice case related to the informed consent for a surgery performed on the Crawford's adopted child (known as M.C.) at [Medical University of South Carolina] in April 2006". The case was one of the first lawsuit of its type to challenge "legal, ethical, and medical issues regarding genital-normalizing surgery" in minors, and was eventually settled out of court by the Medical University of South Carolina for $440,000 in 2017.

=== Information and support ===
Access to information, medical records, peer and other counselling and support. With the rise of modern medical science in Western societies, a secrecy-based model was also adopted, in the belief that this was necessary to ensure normal physical and psychosocial development.

=== Legal recognition ===
The Asia Pacific Forum of National Human Rights Institutions states that legal recognition is firstly "about intersex people who have been issued a male or a female birth certificate being able to enjoy the same legal rights as other men and women". In some regions, obtaining any form of birth certification may be an issue. A Kenyan court case in 2014 established the right of an intersex boy, "Baby A", to a birth certificate.

Like all individuals, some intersex individuals may be raised as a certain sex (male or female) but then identify with another later in life, while most do not. Recognition of third sex or gender classifications occurs in several countries, however, it is controversial when it becomes assumed or coercive, as is the case with some German infants. Sociological research in Australia, a country with a third 'X' sex classification, shows that 19% of people born with atypical sex characteristics selected an "X" or "other" option, while 75% of survey respondents self-described as male or female (52% as women, 23% as men), and 6% as unsure.

On January 20, 2025, US president Donald Trump signed Executive Order 14168, entitled "Defending Women from Gender Ideology Extremism and Restoring Biological Truth to the Federal Government". This executive order asserts that it is the policy of the United States that there are only two sexes, male and female, and that these sexes are immutable throughout a person's life, starting at conception. The executive order does not acknowledge the existence of, or make provision for, intersex people. According to intersex advocate Alicia Roth Weigel, this order "attempts to negate [Intersex people's] very existence".

== LGBT and LGBTI ==
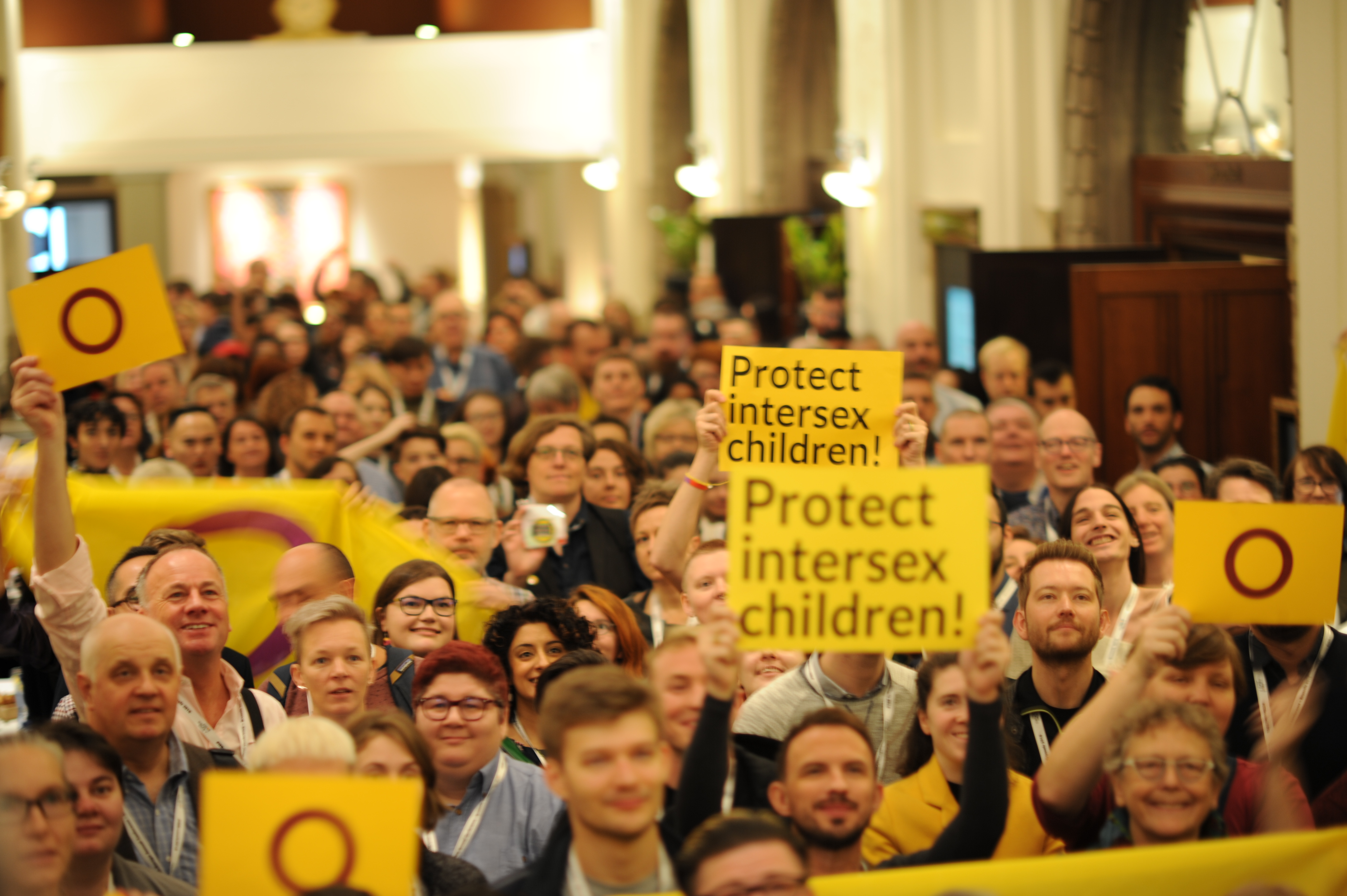
ILGA conference 2018, group photo to mark Intersex Awareness Day

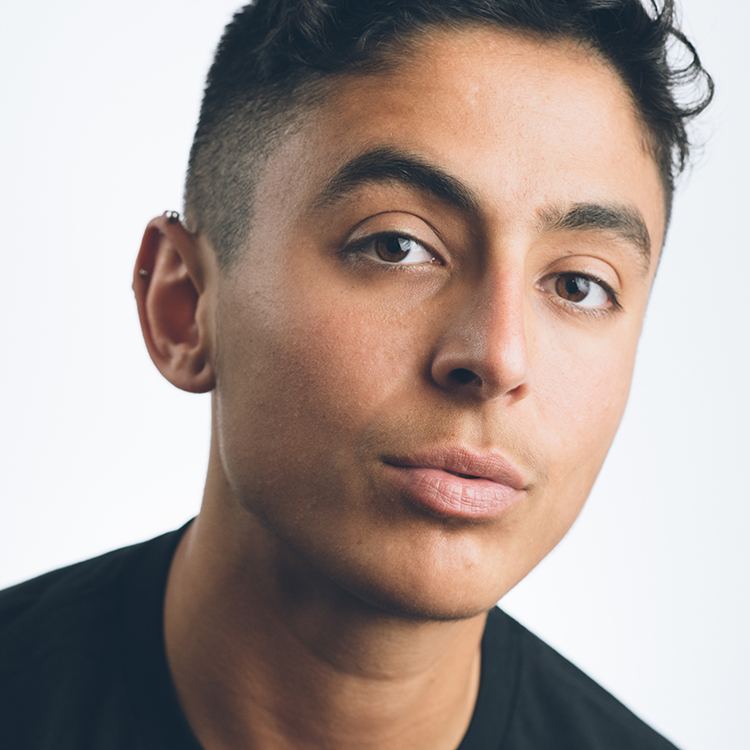
U.S. intersex activist Pidgeon Pagonis

Intersex conditions can be contrasted with transgender gender identities and the attached gender dysphoria a transgender person may feel, wherein their gender identity does not match their assigned sex. However, some people are both intersex and transgender; although intersex people by definition have variable sex characteristics that do not align with either typically male or female, this may be considered separate to an individual's assigned gender, the way they are raised and perceived, and their internal gender identity. A 2012 clinical review paper found that between 8.5% and 20% of people with intersex variations experienced gender dysphoria. In an analysis of the use of preimplantation genetic diagnosis to eliminate intersex traits, Behrmann and Ravitsky state: "Parental choice against intersex may ... conceal biases against same-sex attractedness and gender nonconformity."

The relationship of intersex people and communities to LGBTQ communities is complex, but intersex people are often added to the LGBT acronym, resulting in the acronym LGBTI (or when also including asexual people, LGBTQIA+). Emi Koyama describes how inclusion of intersex in LGBTI can fail to address intersex-specific human rights issues, including creating false impressions "that intersex people's rights are protected" by laws protecting LGBT people, and failing to acknowledge that many intersex people are not LGBT. Organisation Intersex International Australia states that some intersex individuals are homosexual, and some are heterosexual, but "LGBTI activism has fought for the rights of people who fall outside of expected binary sex and gender norms." Julius Kaggwa of SIPD Uganda has written that, while the gay community "offers us a place of relative safety, it is also oblivious to our specific needs". Mauro Cabral has written that transgender people and organizations "need to stop approaching intersex issues as if they were trans issues", including use of intersex conditions and people as a means of explaining being transgender; "we can collaborate a lot with the intersex movement by making it clear how wrong that approach is."

== In society ==
=== Fiction, literature and media ===
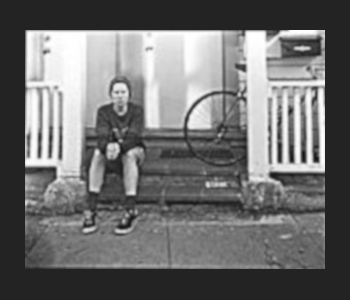
Kristi Bruce after shooting the documentary XXXY, 2000

Robert A. Heinlein's acclaimed 1959 "'—All You Zombies—'" is an early intersex science fiction story, based on time travel.

An intersex character is the narrator in Jeffrey Eugenides' Pulitzer Prize-winning novel Middlesex.

A number of memoirs focused on intersex identity have been published, including Born Both: An Intersex Life by Hida Viloria (which was nominated for the 2018 Lambda Literary Award for Nonfiction), Nobody Needs to Know by Pidgeon Pagonis, Inverse Cowgirl by Alicia Roth Weigel, and XOXY by Kimberly Zieselman.

Television works about intersex people and films about intersex people are scarce. The Spanish-language film XXY won the Critics' Week grand prize at the 2007 Cannes Film Festival and the ACID/CCAS Support Award. Faking It is notable for providing both the first intersex main character in a television show, and television's first intersex character played by an intersex actor.

=== Civil society institutions ===
Intersex peer support and advocacy organizations have existed since at least 1985, with the establishment of the Androgen Insensitivity Syndrome Support Group Australia in 1985. The Androgen Insensitivity Syndrome Support Group (UK) was established in 1988. The Intersex Society of North America (ISNA) may have been one of the first intersex civil society organizations to have been open to people regardless of diagnosis; it was active from 1993 to 2008.

=== Events ===
Intersex Awareness Day is an internationally observed civil awareness day designed to highlight the challenges faced by intersex people, occurring annually on 26 October. It marks the first public demonstration by intersex people, which took place in Boston on 26 October 1996, outside a venue where the American Academy of Pediatrics was holding its annual conference. The commemoration day itself began in 2003 with the establishment of a central awareness raising site by Betsy Driver and Emi Koyama. A central awareness raising site was later re-established in 2015 by Morgan Carpenter with Laura Inter of Brújula Intersexual, and support from Open Society Foundations.

Intersex Day of Remembrance, also known as Intersex Solidarity Day, is an internationally observed civil awareness day designed to highlight issues faced by intersex people, occurring annually on 8 November. The event appears to have begun on November 8, 2005, as Intersex Solidarity Day, following an invitation issued by Joëlle-Circé Laramée, then Canadian spokeswoman for Organisation Intersex International. The Organisation invited organisations and groups and individuals to show solidarity by marking the life of Herculine Barbin, or discussing intersex genital mutilation, "the violence of the binary sex and gender system" and/or "the sexism implicit within the binary construct of sex and gender". Herculine Barbin was a French intersex person; her memoirs were published by Michel Foucault in Herculine Barbin: Being the Recently Discovered Memoirs of a Nineteenth-century French Hermaphrodite.

=== Flags and symbolism ===
The intersex flag created in July 2013 by Morgan Carpenter of Intersex Human Rights Australia

The Progress Pride Flag flag with the intersex flag, created in 2021 by Valentino Vecchietti of Intersex Equality Rights UK

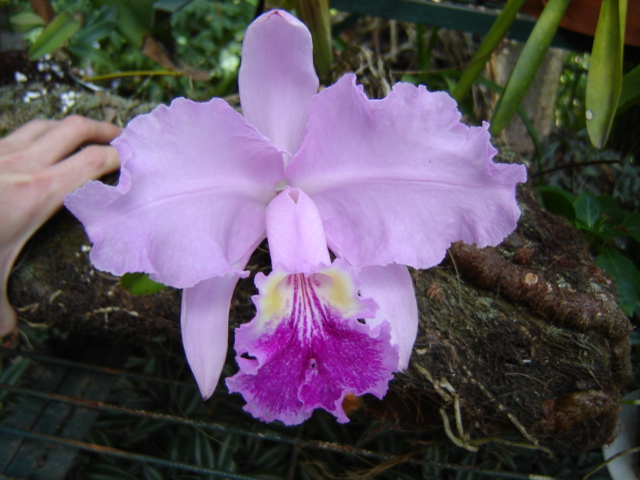
An orchid flower

The intersex flag was created in July 2013 by Morgan Carpenter of Intersex Human Rights Australia to create a flag "that is not derivative, but is yet firmly grounded in meaning". The circle is described as "unbroken and unornamented, symbolising wholeness and completeness, and our potentialities. We are still fighting for bodily autonomy and genital integrity, and this symbolises the right to be who and how we want to be."

In 2021, Valentino Vecchietti of Intersex Equality Rights UK redesigned the Progress Pride Flag to incorporate the intersex flag. This design added a yellow triangle with a purple circle in it to the chevron of the Progress Pride flag. It also changed the color of green to a lighter shade without adding new symbolism. Intersex Equality Rights UK posted the new flag on Instagram and Twitter.

Because the word "orchid" comes from the Greek word for testicle, and the orchiectomy is a common surgery performed on intersex infants, the orchid flower is a symbol of being intersex and of opposition to non-consensual genital surgery.

=== Religion ===
In Judaism, the Talmud contains extensive discussion concerning the status of two types of intersex people in Jewish law; namely, the androgynous, who exhibit both male and female external sexual organs, and the tumtum, who exhibit neither. In the 1970s and 1980s, the treatment of intersex babies started to be discussed in Orthodox Jewish medical halacha by prominent rabbinic leaders, such as Eliezer Waldenberg and Moshe Feinstein.

=== Sport ===
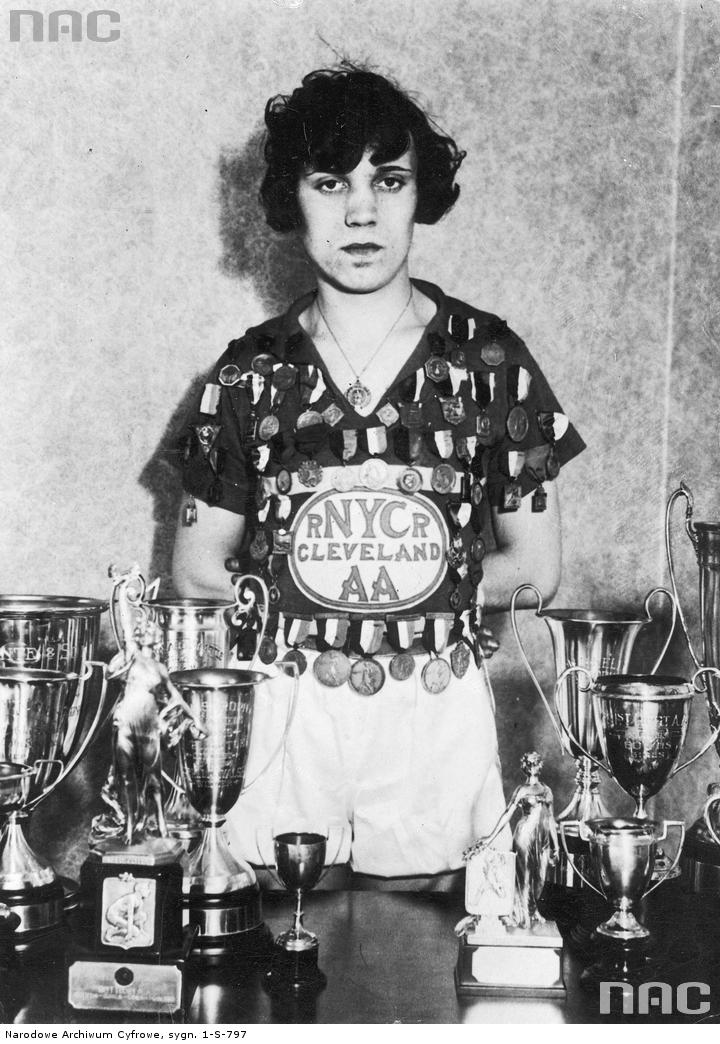
Stanisława Walasiewicz, an athlete posthumously diagnosed with Turner syndrome in 1980, photographed in 1933

Erik Schinegger, Foekje Dillema, Maria José Martínez Patiño and Santhi Soundarajan were subject to adverse sex verification testing resulting in ineligibility to compete in organised competitive competition. Stanisława Walasiewicz, an athlete diagnosed posthumously with Turner syndrome was posthumously ruled ineligible to have competed.

The South African middle-distance runner Caster Semenya won 3 World Championships gold medals and 2 Olympic gold medals in the women's 800 metres. When Semenya won gold at the 2009 World Championships, the International Association of Athletics Federations (IAAF) requested sex verification tests on the same day. The results were not released, and Semenya was ruled eligible to compete. In 2019, new IAAF rules came into force for athletes like Semenya with certain disorders of sex development (DSDs) requiring medication to suppress testosterone levels in order to participate in 400m, 800m, and 1500m women's events. Semenya objected to undergoing the treatment which is now mandatory. She has filed a series of legal cases to restore her ability to compete in these events without testosterone suppression, arguing that the World Athletics rules are discriminatory.

Katrina Karkazis, Rebecca Jordan-Young, Georgiann Davis and Silvia Camporesi have claimed that IAAF policies on "hyperandrogenism" in female athletes are "significantly flawed", arguing that the policy does not protect against breaches of privacy, requires athletes to undergo unnecessary treatment in order to compete, and intensifies "gender policing", and recommended that athletes be able to compete in accordance with their legally recognized gender.

In April 2014, the BMJ reported that four elite women athletes with XY chromosomes and 5α-reductase 2 deficiency were subjected to sterilization and "partial clitoridectomies" in order to compete in sport. The authors noted that partial clitoridectomy was "not medically indicated" and "does not relate to real or perceived athletic 'advantage'". Intersex advocates regarded this intervention as "a clearly coercive process". In 2016, the United Nations special rapporteur on health, Dainius Pūras, criticized "current and historic" sex verification policies, describing how "a number of athletes have undergone gonadectomy (removal of reproductive organs) and partial clitoridectomy (a form of female genital mutilation) in the absence of symptoms or health issues warranting those procedures."

== Biology ==
The notion of intersex individuals can be understood in the context of sexual system biology that varies across different types of organisms. Most animal species (~95%, including humans) are gonochoric, in which individuals are of either a female or male sex. Hermaphroditic species (some animals and most flowering plants) are represented by individuals that can express both sexes simultaneously or sequentially during their lifetimes. Intersex individuals in a number of gonochoric species, who express both female and male phenotypic characters to some degree, are known to exist at low prevalences.

Although "hermaphrodite" and "intersex" have been used synonymously in humans, a hermaphrodite is specifically an individual capable of producing female and male gametes. While there are reports of individuals that seemed to have the potential to produce both types of gamete, in more recent years the term hermaphrodite as applied to humans has fallen out of favor, since female and male reproductive functions have not been observed together in the same individual.

== Medical ==
Research in the late 20th century led to a growing medical consensus that diverse intersex bodies are normal, but relatively rare, forms of human biology. Clinician and researcher Milton Diamond stresses the importance of care in the selection of language related to intersex people:

Foremost, we advocate use of the terms "typical", "usual", or "most frequent" where it is more common to use the term "normal". When possible avoid expressions such as maldeveloped or undeveloped, errors of development, defective genitals, abnormal, or mistakes of nature. Emphasize that all of these conditions are biologically understandable while they are statistically uncommon.

=== Medical classifications ===
==== Sexual differentiation ====
The common pathway of sexual differentiation, where a human female has an XX chromosome pair, and a male has an XY pair, is relevant to the development of intersex conditions.

During fertilization, the sperm adds either an X (female) or a Y (male) chromosome to the X in the ovum. This determines the genetic sex of the embryo. During the first weeks of development, genetic male and female fetuses are "anatomically indistinguishable", with primitive gonads beginning to develop during approximately the sixth week of gestation. The gonads, in a bipotential state, may develop into either testes (the male gonads) or ovaries (the female gonads), depending on the consequent events. Up until and including the seventh week, genetically female and genetically male fetuses appear identical.

At around eight weeks of gestation, the gonads of an XY embryo differentiate into functional testes, secreting testosterone. Ovarian differentiation, for XX embryos, does not occur until approximately week 12 of gestation. In typical female differentiation, the Müllerian duct system develops into the uterus, fallopian tubes, and inner third of the vagina. In males, the Müllerian duct-inhibiting hormone AMH causes this duct system to regress. Next, androgens cause the development of the Wolffian duct system, which develops into the vas deferens, seminal vesicles, and ejaculatory ducts. By birth, the typical fetus has been completely sexed male or female, meaning that the genetic sex (XY-male or XX-female) corresponds with the phenotypical sex; that is to say, genetic sex corresponds with internal and external gonads, and external appearance of the genitals.

==== Signs ====
There are a variety of symptoms that can occur. Ambiguous genitalia is the most common sign. There can be micropenis, clitoromegaly, partial labial fusion, electrolyte abnormalities, delayed or absent puberty, unexpected changes at puberty, hypospadias, labial or inguinal (groin) masses (which may turn out to be testes) in girls and undescended testes (which may turn out to be ovaries) in boys.

==== Ambiguous genitalia ====
Ambiguous genitalia may appear as a large clitoris or as a small penis.

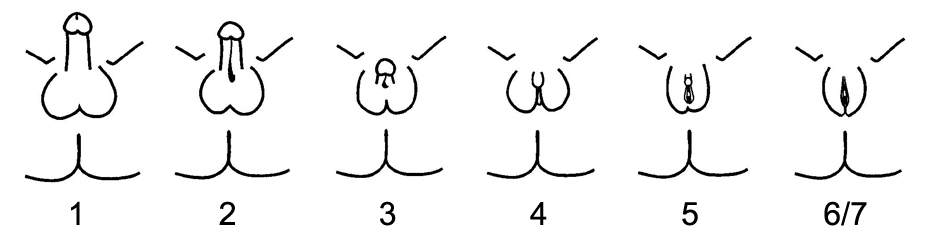
The Quigley scale is a method for describing genital development in AIS.

Because there is variation in all of the processes of the development of the sex organs, a child can be born with a sexual anatomy that is typically female or feminine in appearance with a larger-than-average clitoris (clitoral hypertrophy) or typically male or masculine in appearance with a smaller-than-average penis that is open along the underside. The appearance may be quite ambiguous, describable as female genitals (a vulva) with an enlarged clitoris and partially fused labia, or as male genitals with a small penis, completely open along the midline ("hypospadic"), and empty scrotum. Fertility is variable.

==== Measurement systems for ambiguous genitalia ====
The orchidometer is a medical instrument to measure the volume of the testicles. It was developed by Swiss pediatric endocrinologist Andrea Prader. The Prader scale and Quigley scale are visual rating systems that measure genital appearance. These measurement systems were satirized in the Phall-O-Meter, created by the (now defunct) Intersex Society of North America.

==== Other signs ====
In order to help in classification, methods other than a genitalia inspection can be performed. For instance, a karyotype display of a tissue sample may determine which of the causes of intersex is prevalent in the case. Additionally, electrolyte tests, endoscopic exam, ultrasound and hormone stimulation tests can be done.

==== Causes ====
Intersex can be divided into four categories which are: 46, XX intersex; 46, XY intersex; true gonadal intersex; and complex or undetermined intersex.

===== 46, XX intersex =====
This condition used to be called "female pseudohermaphroditism". People with this condition have female internal genitalia and karyotype (XX) and various degree of external genitalia virilization. External genitalia is masculinized congenitally when female fetus is exposed to excess androgenic environment. Hence, the chromosome of the person is of a female, the ovaries of a female, but external genitals that appear like a male. The labia fuse, and the clitoris enlarges to appear like a penis. The causes of this can be male hormones taken during pregnancy, congenital adrenal hyperplasia, male-hormone-producing tumors in the mother and aromatase deficiency.

===== 46, XY intersex =====
This condition used to be called "male pseudohermaphroditism". This is defined as incomplete masculinization of the external genitalia. Thus, the person has male chromosomes, but the external genitals are incompletely formed, ambiguous, or clearly female. This condition is also called 46, XY with undervirilization. 46, XY intersex has many possible causes, which can be problems with the testes and testosterone formation. Also, there can be problems with using testosterone. Some people lack the enzyme needed to convert testosterone to dihydrotestosterone, which is a cause of 5-alpha-reductase 2 deficiency. Androgen insensitivity syndrome is the most common cause of 46, XY intersex.

===== Ovotesticular syndrome =====
This condition used to be called "true hermaphroditism". This is defined as having asymmetrical gonads with ovarian and testicular differentiation on either sides separately or combined as ovotestis. In most cases, the cause of this condition is unknown.

===== Complex or undetermined intersex =====
This is the condition of having any chromosome configurations rather than 46, XX or 46, XY intersex. This condition does not result in an imbalance between internal and external genitalia. However, there may be problems with sex hormone levels, overall sexual development, and altered numbers of sex chromosomes.

==== Conditions ====
There are a variety of opinions on what conditions or traits are and are not intersex, dependent on the definition of intersex that is used. Current human rights based definitions stress a broad diversity of sex characteristics that differ from expectations for male or female bodies. During 2015, the Council of Europe, the European Union Agency for Fundamental Rights and Inter-American Commission on Human Rights have called for a review of medical classifications on the basis that they presently impede enjoyment of the right to health; the Council of Europe expressed concern that "the gap between the expectations of human rights organisations of intersex people and the development of medical classifications has possibly widened over the past decade."

=== Medical interventions ===
==== Rationales ====
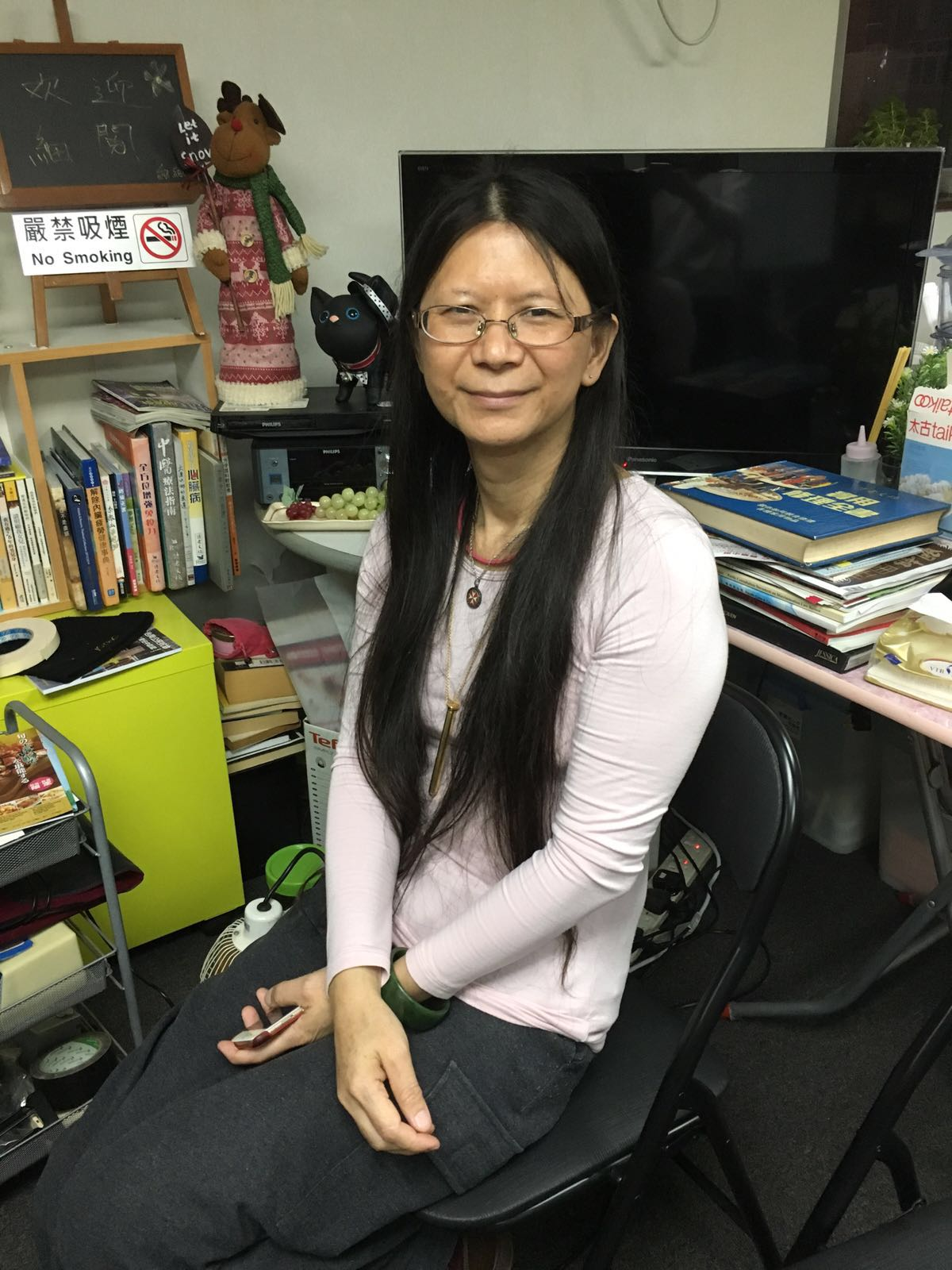
Hong Kong intersex activist Small Luk

Medical interventions take place to address physical health concerns and psychosocial risks. Both types of rationale are the subject of debate, particularly as the consequences of surgical (and many hormonal) interventions are lifelong and irreversible. Questions regarding physical health include accurately assessing risk levels, necessity, and timing. Psychosocial rationales are particularly susceptible to questions of necessity as they reflect social and cultural concerns.

There remains no clinical consensus about an evidence base, surgical timing, necessity, type of surgical intervention, and degree of difference warranting intervention. Such surgeries are the subject of significant contention due to consequences that include trauma, impact on sexual function and sensation, and violation of rights to physical and mental integrity. This includes community activism, and multiple reports by international human rights and health institutions and national ethics bodies.

In the cases where gonads may pose a cancer risk, as in some cases of androgen insensitivity syndrome, concern has been expressed that treatment rationales and decision-making regarding cancer risk may encapsulate decisions around a desire for surgical "normalization".

==== Types ====
- Feminizing and masculinizing surgeries: Surgical procedures depend on the diagnosis, and there is often a concern as to whether surgery should be performed at all. Typically, surgery is performed shortly after birth. Defenders of the practice argue that individuals must be clearly identified as male or female for them to function socially and develop "normally". Psychosocial reasons are often stated. This is criticised by many human rights institutions, and authors. Unlike other aesthetic surgical procedures performed on infants, such as corrective surgery for a cleft lip, genital surgery may lead to negative consequences for sexual functioning in later life, or feelings of freakishness and unacceptability.
- Hormone treatment: There is widespread evidence of prenatal testing and hormone treatment to prevent or eliminate intersex traits, associated also with the problematization of sexual orientation and gender non-conformity.
- Psychosocial support: All stakeholders support psychosocial support. A joint international statement by participants at the Third International Intersex Forum in 2013 sought, among other demands: "Recognition that medicalization and stigmatisation of intersex people result in significant trauma and mental health concerns. In view of ensuring the bodily integrity and well-being of intersex people, autonomous non-pathologising psycho-social and peer support be available to intersex people throughout their life (as self-required), as well as to parents and/or care providers."
- Genetic selection and terminations: The ethics of preimplantation genetic diagnosis to select against intersex traits was the subject of 11 papers in the October 2013 issue of the American Journal of Bioethics. There is widespread evidence of pregnancy terminations arising from prenatal testing, as well as prenatal hormone treatment to prevent intersex traits. Behrmann and Ravitsky find social concepts of sex, gender and sexual orientation to be "intertwined on many levels. Parental choice against intersex may thus conceal biases against same-sex attractedness and gender nonconformity."
- Medical display. Photographs of intersex children's genitalia are circulated in medical communities for documentary purposes, and individuals with intersex traits may be subjected to repeated genital examinations and display to medical teams. Problems associated with experiences of medical photography of intersex children have been discussed along with their ethics, control and usage. "The experience of being photographed has exemplified for many people with intersex conditions the powerlessness and humiliation felt during medical investigations and interventions."
- Gender dysphoria: The DSM-5 included a change from using gender identity disorder to gender dysphoria. This revised code now specifically includes intersex people who do not identify with their sex assigned at birth and experience clinically significant distress or impairment, using the language of disorders of sex development.

== See also ==
- Intersex infanticide
- Intersex people and military service
- Sexual differentiation in humans
- Gynandromorphism
- Endosex

== Bibliography ==
- Asia Pacific Forum of National Human Rights Institutions (June 2016). Promoting and Protecting Human Rights in relation to Sexual Orientation, Gender Identity and Sex Characteristics. ISBN 978-0-9942513-7-4. Archived from the original on 15 January 2017.
- Blackless M, Charuvastra A, Derryck A, Fausto-Sterling A, Lauzanne K, Lee E (2000). "How sexually dimorphic are we? Review and synthesis". Am J Hum Biol. 12 (2): 151–166. doi:10.1002/(SICI)1520-6300(200003/04)12:2<151::AID-AJHB1>3.0.CO;2-F. PMID 11534012. S2CID 453278.
- Cadden J (1993). Meanings of Sex Difference in the Middle Ages: Medicine, Science, and Culture. Cambridge University Press. ISBN 0-521-34363-1. OCLC 1049779687.
- Council of Europe, Commissioner for Human Rights (April 2015). "Human rights and intersex people, Issue Paper".
- Davis G (2015). Contesting Intersex, The Dubious Diagnosis. New York: NYU Press. ISBN 978-1-4798-3786-1.
- DeVun L (2008). "The Jesus Hermaphrodite: Science and Sex Difference in Premodern Europe". Journal of the History of Ideas. 69 (2): 193–218. doi:10.1353/jhi.2008.0013. PMID 19127832.
- DeVun L (2015). "Erecting Sex: Hermaphrodites and the Medieval Science of Surgery". Osiris. 30 (1): 17–37. doi:10.1086/682954. PMID 27066617.
- DeVun L (2021). The Shape of Sex: Nonbinary Gender from Genesis to the Renaissance. Columbia University Press. ISBN 978-0-231-55136-6.
- Elders MJ, Satcher D, Carmona R (June 2017). "Re-Thinking Genital Surgeries on Intersex Infants" (PDF). Palm Center.
- Fausto-Sterling A (2000). Sexing the Body: Gender Politics and the Construction of Sexuality. Basic Books. ISBN 978-0-465-07714-4.
- Ghattas DC, Heinrich-Böll-Stiftung (2013). Human Rights between the Sexes: A preliminary study on the life situations of inter*individuals. Berlin: Heinrich-Böll-Stiftung. ISBN 978-3-86928-107-0.
- Holmes M, ed. (2009). Critical intersex. Queer interventions. Burlington, VT: Ashgate Publishing. ISBN 978-0-7546-7311-8.
- Hughes IA, Houk C, Ahmed SF, Lee PA, LWPES1/ESPE2 Consensus Group (June 2005). "Consensus statement on management of intersex disorders". Archives of Disease in Childhood. 91 (7): 554–563. doi:10.1136/adc.2006.098319. PMC 2082839. PMID 16624884.
- Marcus de María Arana, de María Arana M (2005). A Human Rights Investigation Into The Medical "Normalization" Of Intersex People. Human Rights Commission of the City and County of San Francisco.
- Human Rights Watch, interACT (July 2017). I Want to Be Like Nature Made Me. Human Rights Watch. ISBN 978-1-62313-502-7.
- Jones T, Hart B, Carpenter M, Ansara G, Leonard W, Lucke J (2016). Intersex: Stories and Statistics from Australia (PDF). Cambridge, UK: Open Book Publishers. ISBN 978-1-78374-208-0. Archived from the original (PDF) on 27 May 2018.
- Jones T (2018). "Intersex Studies: A Systematic Review of International Health Literature". SAGE Open. 2018 (1) 2158244017745577: 1–22. doi:10.1177/2158244017745577.
- Karkazis K (2008). Fixing Sex: Intersex, Medical Authority, and Lived Experience. Duke University Press. ISBN 978-0-8223-4318-9.
- Lee PA, Nordenström A, Houk CP, Ahmed SF, Auchus R, Baratz A, Baratz Dalke K, Liao LM, Lin-Su K, Looijenga LH, Mazur T, Meyer-Bahlburg HF, Mouriquand P, Quigley CA, Sandberg DE, Vilain E, Witchel S, and the Global DSD Update Consortium (28 January 2016). "Global Disorders of Sex Development Update since 2006: Perceptions, Approach and Care". Hormone Research in Paediatrics. 85 (3): 158–180. doi:10.1159/000442975. PMID 26820577.
- Organisation Intersex International Australia, Carpenter M (April 2014). "Submission on the Review of Part B of the Ethical Guidelines for the Use of Assisted Reproductive Technology in Clinical Practice and Research, 2007". Sydney. Archived from the original on 6 October 2014.
- Regmi E (2016). "Stories of Intersex People from Nepal" (PDF). Archived from the original (PDF) on 3 May 2016.
- Tamar-Mattis A (2014). "Medical Treatment of People with Intersex Conditions as Torture and Cruel, Inhuman, or Degrading Treatment or Punishment". Torture in Healthcare Settings: Reflections on the Special Rapporteur on Torture's 2013 Thematic Report (PDF). Washington, DC: Washington College of Law Center for Human Rights & Humanitarian Law. pp. 91–104. Archived from the original (PDF) on 27 March 2014.
- United Nations Office of the High Commissioner for Human Rights (2015). "Free & Equal Campaign Fact Sheet: Intersex" (PDF).
- UN Committee against Torture, UN Committee on the Rights of the Child, UN Committee on the Rights of People with Disabilities, UN Subcommittee on Prevention of Torture and other Cruel, Inhuman or Degrading Treatment or Punishment, Juan Méndez, Dainius Pūras, Dubravka Šimonoviæ, Marta Santos Pais, African Commission on Human and Peoples' Rights, Council of Europe Commissioner for Human Rights, Inter-American Commission on Human Rights (24 October 2016). "Intersex Awareness Day – Wednesday 26 October. End violence and harmful medical practices on intersex children and adults, UN and regional experts urge". Office of the High Commissioner for Human Rights.
- World Health Organization, OHCHR, UN Women, UNAIDS, UNDP, UNFPA, UNICEF (2014). Eliminating forced, coercive and otherwise involuntary sterilization, An interagency statement (PDF). ISBN 978-92-4-150732-5.
- Zwischengeschlecht (March 2014). "IGM – Historical Overview. Hermaphrodites in the 'Developed World': From Legal Self-Determination to IGM, Supplement 1" (PDF). NGO Report to the 2nd, 3rd and 4th Periodic Report of Switzerland on the Convention on the Rights of the Child (CRC) (2 ed.). pp. 49–62.
