= Natasha Jiménez =

Costa Rican trans and intersex activist

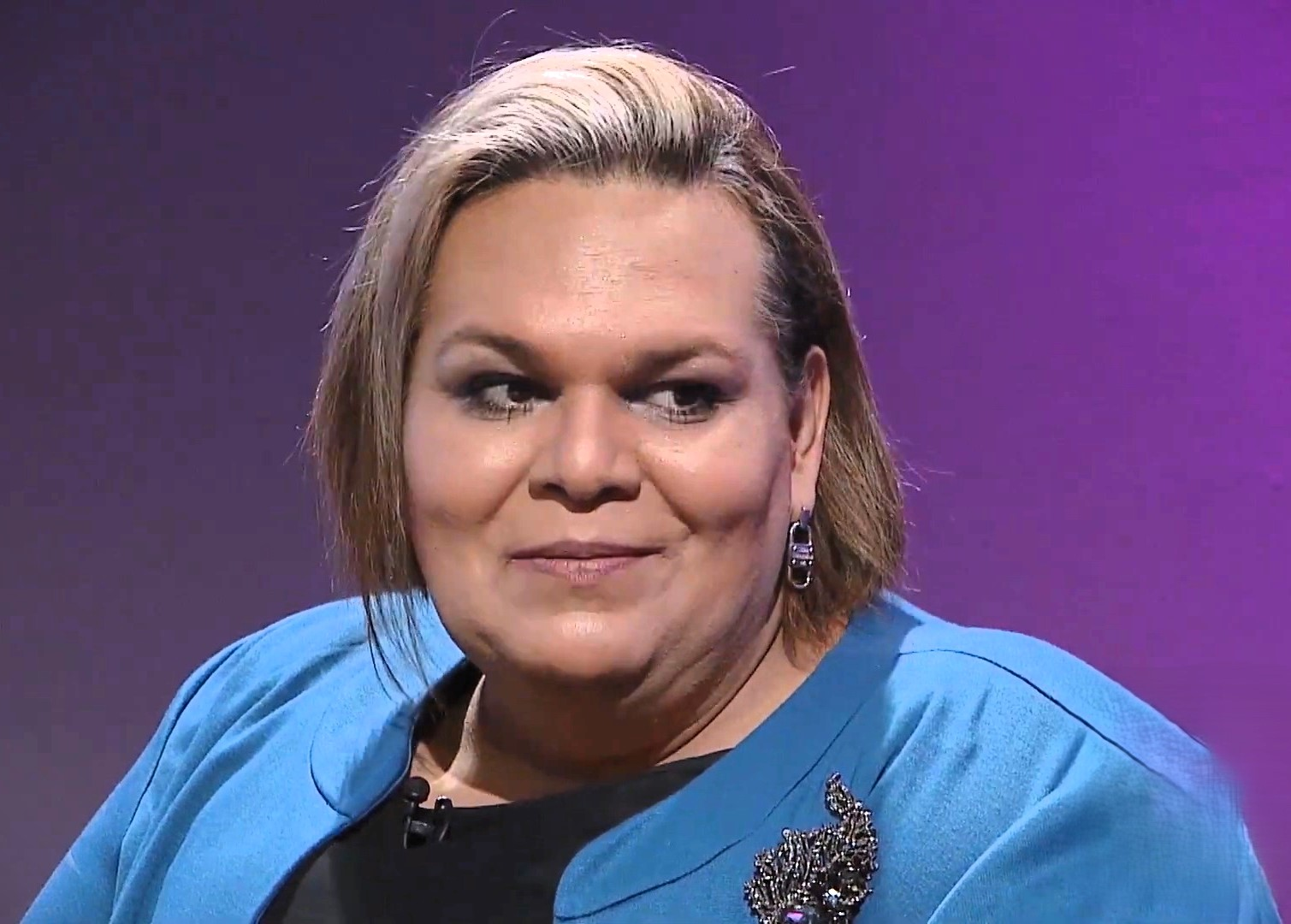
- Jiménez in 2017
- Known for: Trans and intersex activist

Natasha Jiménez is a trans and intersex activist and author who is currently the General Coordinator for MULABI, Latin American Space for Sexualities and Rights, the first host of the Intersex Secretariat for ILGA. She is an advisory board member for the first intersex human rights fund and participated in the first intersex hearing on human rights before the Inter-American Commission on Human Rights.

== Activism ==
An intersex and trans activist for over 30 years, Jiménez started her activism in feminist and LGBT movements in Latin America, and speaks at a range of national and international human rights institutions. In Terrorizing Women: Feminicide in the Americas, Rosa-Linda Fregoso and Cynthia Bejarando Jímenez remarks,

"The 'official history' of human-kind as we know it, is a history in which 'travestis,' trans and intersex women are invisible....Most of us are forced to live in the margins of society after being rejected by our families and the community as a whole. When we organize ourselves to defend our rights, usually we face police abuse and extortion. The price we pay for becoming leaders and encouraging our peers to resist is often murder, torture, arbitrary arrest, or forced displacement"

In March 2013, Jiménez, together with Mauro Cabral, Paula Sandrine Machado and Pidgeon Pagonis testified to the Inter-American Commission on Human Rights on Situation of Human Rights of Intersex Persons in the Americas. The first hearing on intersex human rights before the Commission, each shared their personal experiences and presented broader issues, such as "normalization" surgery on the genitals of intersex infants.

In 2015, Jiménez joined an international advisory board for a first philanthropic Intersex Human Rights Fund established by the Astraea Lesbian Foundation for Justice. In 2016, the role of Intersex Secretariat of ILGA was passed to Miriam van der Have.

== Works ==
Jiménez has contributed to Inter: Erfahrungen intergeschlechtlicher Menschen in der Welt der zwei Geschlechter, edited by Elisa Barth et al., What is the Point of a Revolution if I Can’t Dance by Jane Barry and Jelena Dordevic, and Interdicciones edited by Mauro Cabral.

== See also ==
- International Lesbian, Gay, Bisexual, Trans and Intersex Association
