= Georgiann Davis =

American sociologist

- Born: Illinois, United States
- Occupation: Professor of sociology
- Known for: Author, educator

Georgiann Davis is a professor of sociology at the University of New Mexico and author of the book Contesting Intersex: The Dubious Diagnosis. Davis formerly held similar positions at University of Nevada, Las Vegas and Southern Illinois University Edwardsville. Born with Androgen Insensitivity Syndrome, she writes widely on intersex issues and the sociology of diagnosis.

== Early life ==
In a video for The Interface Project, Davis states how she was born with complete androgen insensitivity syndrome and diagnosed as an adolescent after experiencing abdominal pain. Her testes were removed, but she wasn't told her diagnosis: she was told she had cancer. In an article for Ms. Magazine, she says:

"cancer rhetoric is used to justify surgical interventions ... A body that challenges binary understandings of sex is scary to those who refuse to embrace natural biological diversity found across species. For years, many medical doctors reached for their scalpels to ease their fears and assert their authority over the body."

== Works ==
=== Book ===
Contesting Intersex: The Dubious Diagnosis by Georgiann Davis examines the history of the U.S. intersex movement, with a focus on the medicalization of intersex bodies and a contested shift in clinical language from intersex to "disorders of sex development". Published by NYU Press, the book has been positively reviewed. Elizabeth Reis comments that Davis's work contains "piercing interviews and astute analysis", while Choice describes he book as a "compelling account of how activists, parents, assorted medical specialists and institutions, and people with intersex traits respond to the diversity of human reproductive development".

=== Scholarly and other works ===
Georgiann Davis has written both scholarly articles, and opinion articles for broader audiences. Her scholarly work includes articles on the issues of Preimplantation Genetic Diagnosis (PGD), Olympic sex-testing, and both medical terminology and the medical profession.

In the 2011 article, "'DSD is a Perfectly Fine Term': Reasserting Medical Authority through a Shift in Intersex Terminology", Davis examines the state of medical treatment for intersex traits, following a 2006 Consensus Statement on the Management of Intersex Disorders. She describes how:

Medical professionals needed to maintain their authority in the face of intersex activism, and they did so linguistically through a reinvention of the intersex diagnosis. The new DSD terminology constructs "sex" as a scientific phenomenon, and a binary one at that...This places intersexuality neatly into medical turf and safely away from critics of its medicalisation.

Davis's analysis was referenced by a committee of the Senate of Australia in 2013.

In "Out of Bounds? A Critique of the New Policies on Hyperandrogenism in Elite Female Athletes", a collaborative article with Katrina Karkazis, Rebecca Jordan-Young, and Silvia Camporesi, published in 2012 in the American Journal of Bioethics, they argue that a new sex testing policy by the International Association of Athletics Federations will not protect against breaches of privacy, will require athletes to undergo unnecessary treatment in order to compete, and will intensify "gender policing". They recommend that athletes be able to compete in accordance with their legal gender.

In 2013, her article "The Social Costs of Preempting Intersex Traits" was published in the American Journal of Bioethics. She questions the use of Preimplantation Genetic Diagnosis to select against intersex traits, arguing that intersex traits reflect necessary natural diversity; deselection of intersex embryos essentially protects "binary ideologies about sex and its presumed correlation with gender". She describes this as a form of sex eugenics that would "obliterate" an intersex community of individuals leading full and happy lives, a community that forces "society to disentangle sex and gender, and in the process, open up new possibilities for embracing all sorts of human diversity." Further, if de-selection of intersex traits is “morally permissible” due to stigma and poor social outcomes, then "we need to recognize that a major source of the shame and stigma individuals with intersex traits face originates in the medical profession"

=== Selected bibliography ===
==== Scholarly works ====
- Davis, Georgiann (2015). Contesting Intersex: The Dubious Diagnosi. New York: NYU Press. ISBN 9781479887040.
- Davis, Georgiann (2015). "Normalizing Intersex: The Transformative Power of Stories". Narrative Inquiry in Bioethics. 5 (2): 87–89. doi:10.1353/nib.2015.0055. PMID 26300130. S2CID 38270082.
- Davis, G.; Dewey, J. M.; Murphy, E. L. (September 2015). "Giving sex: Deconstructing Intersex and Trans Medicalization Practices". Gender & Society. 30 (3): 490–514. doi:10.1177/0891243215602102. ISSN 0891-2432. S2CID 143196138.
- Davis, Georgiann (February 2, 2014). "The power in a name: diagnostic terminology and diverse experiences". Psychology & Sexuality. 5 (1): 15–27. doi:10.1080/19419899.2013.831212. ISSN 1941-9899. S2CID 145413579.
- Davis, Georgiann; Murphy, Erin L. (2013). "Intersex Bodies as States of Exception: An Empirical Explanation for Unnecessary Surgical Modification". Feminist Formations. 25 (2): 129–152. doi:10.1353/ff.2013.0022. ISSN 2151-7371. S2CID 144869690.
- Davis, Georgiann; Allison, Rachel (November 2013). "White Coats, Black Specialists? Racial Divides in the Medical Profession". Sociological Spectrum. 33 (6): 510–533. doi:10.1080/02732173.2013.836143. ISSN 0273-2173. S2CID 144510374.
- Davis, Georgiann (October 2013). "The Social Costs of Preempting Intersex Traits". The American Journal of Bioethics. 13 (10): 51–53. doi:10.1080/15265161.2013.828119. ISSN 1526-5161. PMID 24024811. S2CID 7331095.
- Karkazis, Katrina; Jordan-Young, Rebecca; Davis, Georgiann; Camporesi, Silvia (July 2012). "Out of Bounds? A Critique of the New Policies on Hyperandrogenism in Elite Female Athletes". The American Journal of Bioethics. 12 (7): 3–16. doi:10.1080/15265161.2012.680533. ISSN 1526-5161. PMC 5152729. PMID 22694023.
- Davis, Georgiann (2011). ""DSD is a Perfectly Fine Term": Reasserting Medical Authority through a Shift in Intersex Terminology". In PJ McGann; David J Hutson (eds.). Advances in Medical Sociology. Vol. 12. Bingley: Emerald Group Publishing. pp. 155–182. doi:10.1108/S1057-6290(2011)0000012012. ISBN 978-0-85724-575-5.

==== Opinion pieces ====
- Davis, Georgiann; Pagonis, Pidgeon (August 2016). "Bias Against Intersex Olympics Athletes Is What's Unfair – Not These Athletes' Bodies". Everyday Feminism.
- Davis, Georgiann (October 19, 2016). "Intersexy Fat". Intersex Day.
- Davis, Georgiann (January 21, 2016). "Five Things You Can Do For Your Intersex Child". The Parents Project. Archived from the original on 2016-05-16.
- Davis, Georgiann (October 7, 2015). "5 Things I Wish You Knew About Intersex People". UNLV News Center.
- Davis, Georgiann (July 7, 2015). "What's marriage equality got to do with intersex?". Contexts. Vol. Spring 2015.
- Wall, Sean Saifa; Davis, Georgiann (February 26, 2014). "Op-ed: Hey, Fox News, Intersex Is Not A Punchline". The Advocate.
- Davis, Georgiann (May 9, 2013). "Standing with Susie the Dachshund". Ms. Magazine.
- Davis, Georgiann (February 7, 2013). "UN Condemns "Normalization" Surgery for Intersexuality". Ms Magazine.

== Academic interests ==
Davis is an associate professor of sociology at University of New Mexico, where her academic interests include intersex traits, sex and gender, body and embodiment, and the medical profession.

== Advocacy work ==
Davis is a former president of the AIS-DSD Support Group and is presently on the board of interACT.

== Awards and recognition ==
Davis received the 2014 Vaughnie Lindsay New Investigator Award from Southern Illinois University Edwardsville, following her identification "as the most promising new researcher on her campus". She has also received the 2013 Midwest Sociological Society Research Grant. In 2012, she received the Outstanding Thesis Award, University of Illinois at Chicago (UIC). In earlier years she received the 2010 Rue Bucher Memorial Award and the 2010 Brauner Fellowship at UIC. In 2009 she received the Beth B. Hess Scholarship Award from Sociologists for Women in Society.
