= Sean Saifa Wall =

American intersex rights activist

- Education: Williams College
- Occupations: Intersex activist and researcher
- Known for: Intersex and HIV advocacy
- Website: seansaifa.com

Sean Saifa Wall is an African-American researcher, and long-time advocate for intersex rights. He is a queer, transgender, and intersex man of color and former president of Interact Advocates for Intersex Youth. He approaches his work to end intersex oppression through an intersectional lens.

External videos
- " What It’s Like To Be Intersex", Lizz Warner, BuzzFeed

== Early life and career ==
Sean Saifa Wall has described growing up in the Bronx in the 1980s in a family with other intersex members. In an interview by Pidgeon Pagonis, he describes how an uncle of his was forced to sleep outside on the porch of his hospital after a surgery, and how his intersex and black identities are inseparable. Drawing parallels, Wall has stated, "Although seemingly different subjects, they share the same common denominator, state-sponsored violence against marginalized individuals". Diagnosed with partial androgen insensitivity syndrome, he was subjected to a gonadectomy at age 13, necessitating lifelong hormone replacement therapy.

Wall volunteered for Gay Men's Health Crisis at age 14, prior to studying at Williams College. He later travelled to Cuba with Pastors for Peace, documenting the local health system.

== Activism ==
Wall served as president of Interact Advocates for Intersex Youth for three years. During that time, Interact filed a lawsuit, M.C. v. Medical University of South Carolina, in the County of Richmond, South Carolina, in partnership with the Southern Poverty Law Center.

In 2015, Wall joined an international advisory board for a first philanthropic Intersex Human Rights Fund established by the Astraea Lesbian Foundation for Justice. He has also developed an art project entitled EMERGE.

As part of his advocacy work, Wall has been interviewed by Nightline, in a segment where he also confronted his childhood surgeon, BuzzFeed, HuffPost Live, and written for The Advocate and Quartz. Wall spoke at TEDxGrandRapids in May 2015.

== Personal life ==
Wall has written of being a former Catholic.

== Selected bibliography ==
- Wall, Sean Saifa (November 8, 2016). "Love, complexity and inter-sectionality". Intersex Day.
- Wall, Sean Saifa (2015). "Standing at the Intersections: Navigating Life as a Black Intersex Man". Narrative Inquiry in Bioethics. 5 (2): 117–119. doi:10.1353/nib.2015.0046. PMID 26300141. S2CID 31637580.
- Wall, Sean Saifa (April 26, 2015). "American surgeons are still mutilating children who don't look "normal"". Quartz.
- Wall, Sean Saifa; Davis, Georgiann (February 26, 2014). "Op-ed: Hey, Fox News, Intersex Is Not A Punchline". The Advocate.
