= InterACT =

Nonprofit organization devoted to intersex human rights

interACT
- Advocates for Intersex Youth
- Founded: 2006; 20 years ago
- Founder: Anne Tamar-Mattis
- Tax ID no.: 27-2947576
- Legal status: 501(c)(3) nonprofit organization
- Headquarters: Sudbury, Massachusetts, U.S.
- Coordinates: 42.361916°N 71.416715°W
- Region served: United States
- Executive Director: Kimberly Zieselman
- Legal Director: Anne Tamar-Mattis
- Revenue: $233,756 (2016)
- Expenses: $295,886 (2016)
- Employees: 7 (2016)
- Volunteers: 57 (2016)
- Website: www.interactadvocates.org
- Formerly called: Advocates for Informed Choice

Advocates for Informed Choice, dba interACT or interACT Advocates for Intersex Youth, is a 501(c)(3) nonprofit organization advocating for the legal and human rights of children with intersex traits. The organization was founded in 2006 and formally incorporated on April 12, 2010.

== History and structure ==
interACT was founded in 2006 in Cotati, California. The organization is now based in Sudbury, Massachusetts. The board of directors includes Arlene Baratz, Georgiann Davis, Emily Doskow, Julie Greenberg, Eric Lohman, Lynnell Stephani Long, Mani Mitchell, Karen Walsh, and Reid Williams. Staff members include Kimberly Zieselman as Executive Director and Anne Tamar-Mattis as Legal Director.

interACT is identified as the successor to the Intersex Society of North America (ISNA), charged with maintaining the ISNA website as a "historical archive".

== Advocacy ==
interACT advocates for the legal and human rights of children born with intersex traits. Strategies include media work and the development of youth leadership, in addition to litigation. Issues of focus are informed consent, insurance, identity documents, school accommodation, discrimination, medical records retrieval, adoption, military service, medical privacy, refugee asylum, and wider international human rights.

=== Physical integrity and bodily autonomy ===
In 2014, following testimony by then staff member Pidgeon Pagonis, Anne Tamar-Mattis was published on medical interventions as torture in healthcare settings, in a book by the Center for Human Rights & Humanitarian Law at American University Washington College of Law. In 2016, the United Nations Committee Against Torture asked the United States government to comment on reports of intersex medical interventions on infants and children, following submission of a report by interACT. As part of its submission, interACT stated that it is "unaware of any jurisdiction in the U.S. that enforces its own FGM laws in cases where the girl undergoing clitoral cutting has an intersex trait".

In July 2017, Human Rights Watch and interACT published a major report on medically unnecessary surgeries on intersex children, "I Want to Be Like Nature Made Me", based on interviews with intersex persons, families and physicians. The report found that "Intersex people in the United States are subjected to medical practices that can inflict irreversible physical and psychological harm on them starting in infancy, harms that can last throughout their lives." The report calls for a ban on "surgical procedures that seek to alter the gonads, genitals, or internal sex organs of children with atypical sex characteristics too young to participate in the decision, when those procedures both carry a meaningful risk of harm and can be safely deferred."

=== Reparations ===
==== M.C. v. Aaronson case ====
On May 14, 2013, interACT, The Southern Poverty Law Center, and pro bono counsel for the private law firms of Janet, Jenner & Suggs and Steptoe & Johnson LLP filed a lawsuit against South Carolina Department of Social Services (SCDSS), Greenville Health System, Medical University of South Carolina and individual employees for performing an irreversible and medically unnecessary surgery on an infant who was in the state's care at the time of the surgery.

The defendants sought to dismiss the case and seek a defense of qualified immunity, but these were denied by the District Court for the District of South Carolina. In January 2015, the Court of Appeals for the Fourth Circuit reversed this decision and dismissed the complaint, stating that, "it did not 'mean to diminish the severe harm that M.C. claims to have suffered' but that a reasonable official in 2006 did not have fair warning from then-existing precedent that performing sex assignment surgery on sixteen-month-old M.C. violated a clearly established constitutional right." The Court did not rule on whether or not the surgery violated M.C.'s constitutional rights. State suits were subsequently filed. In July 2017, it was reported that the case had been settled out of court by the Medical University of South Carolina for $440,000, without admission of liability.

=== Youth leadership development ===
interACT Youth is a program for intersex youth, run by intersex youth. All members between 14 and 25 years old, have intersex traits, and are in a place where they are ready to speak out about their experiences. interACT Youth works to provide tomorrow's scholars and activists a platform for their vital perspectives. A product of this work entitled "What We Wish Our Doctors Knew" was the first of its kind: Intersex youth talking back to medical providers and caregivers. InterACT Youth is funded in part by Ms. Foundation and Liberty Hill Foundation.

In 2013, the then youth leadership coordinator, Pidgeon Pagonis, testified for interACT before the Inter-American Commission on Human Rights about the medical interventions they were subjected to as an intersex child, alongside Latin Americans Mauro Cabral, Natasha Jiménez and Paula Machado.

=== Media work ===
interACT has worked with MTV on the program Faking It, notable for providing the first intersex main character in a television show, and television's first intersex character played by an intersex actor. In 2017, interACT began working with Belgian-born model Hanne Gaby Odiele to tackle social taboos and unnecessary surgeries.

interACT published a media guide on covering intersex issues in January 2017.

=== Language ===
Having historically used the current clinical terminology of disorders of sex development, interACT issued a strong statement favoring the term intersex in 2016, citing increasing acceptance and public awareness.

=== Involvement in Senate Bill 201 ===
InterACT has been an advocate for a variety of legislative movements related to intersexuality and those affected. One example of their advocacy is the organization's support and co-sponsorship of the proposed legislation of California Senate Bill 201.

Proposed by Senator Scott Wiener (D-San Francisco) on January 28, 2019, and amended on March 25, 2019, the proposal has yet to be voted on. The Senate Bill would "ensure intersex individuals can provide informed consent before any medical treatments or interventions that could irreversibly affect their fertility or sexual function, as stated on the interACT website. The bill would not prohibit intervention in the instance of a medical emergency.

InterACT commented on the legislation, stating that "This long overdue measure will give individuals the opportunity to delay medically unnecessary, potentially harmful, irreparable procedures until they have the ability to make an informed decision for themselves."

== Interface Project ==
The Interface Project is a tax-exempt 501(c)(3) nonprofit operating under the fiscal sponsorship of interACT. Founded in 2012, and currently curated by Jim Ambrose, The Interface Project features stories of people born with intersex traits or variations of sex anatomy under the banner No Body Is Shameful.

== See also ==
- Intersex human rights
- Intersex rights in the United States
