= Narrative Inquiry in Bioethics =

- Discipline: Bioethics
- Language: English
- Edited by: James M. DuBois, Ana S. Iltis

Publication details
- History: 2011-present
- Publisher: Johns Hopkins University Press on behalf of the Foundation for Narrative Inquiry in Bioethics (United States)
- Frequency: Triannually

Standard abbreviations
- ISO 4: Narrat. Inq. Bioeth.

Indexing
- ISSN: 2157-1732 (print); 2157-1740 (web)
- OCLC no.: 660048035

Links
- Journal homepage; Online access at Project MUSE

Narrative Inquiry in Bioethics is a triannual academic journal that was established in 2011 and published by Johns Hopkins University Press on behalf of the Foundation for Narrative Inquiry in Bioethics. The editors-in-chief are James M. DuBois (Washington University School of Medicine) and Ana S. Iltis (Wake Forest University). The journal provides a forum for exploring current issues in bioethics through the publication and analysis of personal stories, qualitative and mixed-methods research articles, and case studies.
