= Mauro Cabral Grinspan =

Argentinian transgender activist

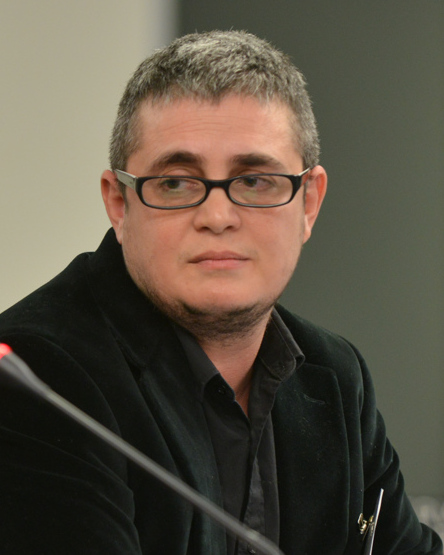
- Mauro Cabral at a human rights conference
- Born: 1971 (age 54–55); Córdoba, Argentina
- Known for: Trans and intersex activist and educator
- Website: transactivists.org

Mauro Cabral Grinspan, also known as Mauro Cabral, is an Argentinian intersex and trans activist and researcher. He coordinates the project on intersex depathologization at InterAction for Health and Human Rights. Previously, he served as the Senior Officer for Gender Justice and Equity at the Global Philanthropy Project. Before that, he was the Executive Director of GATE, organization that he co-founded in 2009. Mauro Cabral Grinspan is a signatory of the Yogyakarta Principles and a signatory of the Yogyakarta Principles Plus 10. In July 2015, Cabral received the inaugural Bob Hepple Equality Award.

== Early life and perspectives ==
Mauro Cabral Grinspan was assigned female at birth, but now lives as male. He has described how his intersex body was discovered to be different or "incomplete" in his teens; after two surgeries he had to undergo several years of invasive procedures. He has said in an interview that the surgery makes him feel that he needed surgery before he could be loved.

Cabral Grinspan argues homophobia is a driving force behind the common urge to "normalize" intersex children into traditional male or female categories, and proposes surgeries for intersex persons send a message to children that their bodies have to be changed to be acceptable. Additionally, Cabral Grinspan suggests a need for broader cultural acceptance of intersex without treating these people as though they suffer from a medical disorder.

== Activism ==
Mauro Cabral Grinspan has been involved in activism on trans and intersex issues since at least 2005. From 2005 to 2007 he was in charge of coordinating the Trans and Intersex Area at the IGLHRC Latin American Office. He then worked for three years at MULABI, Latin American Space for Sexualities and Rights, becoming Executive Director in 2009. Cabral became a co-director of GATE in January 2010 and also co-chairs the International Trans* Reference Group at the Global Forum on MSM and HIV/AIDS. Cabral is a member of the Latin American Consortium on Intersex Issues, and of the International Advisory Board at the Human Rights Watch LGBT Program.

Cabral Grinspan participated in actions that led to the approval of a ground-breaking law on gender identity by the Argentinian Senate in April 2012. The law makes it possible to change sex designation without undergoing surgical or clinical treatment, or judicial approval.

Cabral Grinspan has co-ordinated work on reform of the World Health Organization's International Classification of Diseases, in particular a critique and alternative proposals in relation to "Gender Incongruence of Childhood". He is a contributor to the World Health Organization report "Sexual health, human rights and the law".

Cabral Grinspan helped organise the third International Intersex Forum in Malta, 2013. In 2015, Cabral became the senior advisor for a first philanthropic Intersex Human Rights Fund established by the Astraea Lesbian Foundation for Justice.

In 2006 Cabral participated in the production of the Yogyakarta Principles on the Application of Human Rights Legislation to Sexual Orientation and Gender Identity, and was one of the initial 29 signatories. He is also a drafting committee member and signatory of the Yogyakarta Principles plus 10, on the application of international human rights law in relation to sexual orientation, gender identity, gender expression and sex characteristics.

In January 2024 Intersex Human Rights Australia announced that Cabral had been appointed as the Principal Consultant and Project Coordinator on their newest international project.

== Academic career ==
Cabral Grinspan has a Degree in History from the National University of Córdoba.

== Selected bibliography ==
=== Books ===
- Cabral, Mauro, ed. (February 2009). Interdicciones: Escrituras de la intersexualidad en castellano. Córdoba, Argentina: Mulabi. ISBN 978-987-05-5898-9.

=== Journals ===
- Cabral, Mauro; Suess, Amets; Ehrt, Julia; Seehole, Tshegofatso Joshua; Wong, Joe (May 2016). "Removal of gender incongruence of childhood diagnostic category: a human rights perspective". The Lancet Psychiatry. 3 (5): 405–406. doi:10.1016/S2215-0366(16)30043-8. hdl:10668/10062. ISSN 2215-0366. PMID 27155514.
- Cabral, Mauro; Eisfeld, Justus (November 1, 2015). "Statement from GATE - Global Action for Trans* Equality". Reproductive Health Matters. 23 (46): 196. doi:10.1016/j.rhm.2015.11.014. ISSN 0968-8080. PMID 26719011.
- Cabral, Mauro (December 2014). "Tercera posición en materia de género" (PDF). Derechos Humanos. 3 (8): 199–212.
- Boellstorff, T.; Cabral, M.; Cardenas, M.; Cotten, T.; Stanley, E. A.; Young, K.; Aizura, A. Z. (January 2014). "Decolonizing Transgender: A Roundtable Discussion". TSQ: Transgender Studies Quarterly. 1 (3): 419–439. doi:10.1215/23289252-2685669. ISSN 2328-9252.

=== Editorials ===
- Cabral, Mauro (October 26, 2016). "IAD2016: A Message from Mauro Cabral". GATE. Archived from the original on November 3, 2016.
- Cabral Grinspan, Mauro (October 25, 2015). "The marks on our bodies". Intersex Day.
- Cabral, Mauro; Carpenter, Morgan, eds. (2014). "Intersex Issues in the International Classification of Diseases: a revision" (PDF).
- Cabral, Mauro (April 2013). "Critique and Alternative Proposal to the "Gender Incongruence of Childhood" Category in ICD-11" (PDF). GATE. Archived from the original (PDF) on 2020-06-14.
- Maffia, Diana; Cabral, Mauro (2013). "Los sexos ¿son o se hacen?" (PDF). Buenos Aires. Archived from the original (PDF) on 2020-02-15.

=== Speeches ===
- In September 2016, Cabral gave a keynote presentation at the 2016 Trans*studies conference at the University of Arizona.
- The "first United Nations Human Rights Council side event on intersex issues" in March 2014, alongside representatives of Intersex UK, Organisation Intersex International Australia, and Zwischengeschlecht,
- In March 2013, Mauro Cabral, together with Natasha Jiménez of MULABI, Paula Sandrine Marchado and Pidgeon Pagonis testified to the Inter-American Commission on Human Rights on Situation of Human Rights of Intersex Persons in the Americas. The first hearing on intersex human rights before the Commission, each shared their personal experiences and presented broader issues, such as "normalization" surgery on the genitals of intersex infants.
- On 30 June 2011, Mauro Cabral, gave a speech at the European Parliament Subcommittee on Human Rights on trans and intersex rights.

Cabral has contributed to numerous documents including the Yogyakarta Principles, the World Health Organization report "Sexual health, human rights and the law", and the Open Society Foundations report "Licence to Be Yourself".

== Awards and recognition ==
In July 2015, Cabral was a co-recipient of the inaugural Bob Hepple Equality Award, alongside Pragna Patel of Southall Black Sisters. The award is named for Bob Hepple, the former lawyer of Nelson Mandela. The Oxford Human Rights Hub comments, "Cabral was crucial in the process leading to the enactment of Argentina's Gender Identity Law in 2012, a law which has been extensively cited in court decisions on gender identity cases, including the Indian Supreme Court, and which has inspired legislation reform in countries including Malta, the Netherlands and Sweden."
