= Hanne Gaby Odiele =

Belgian model

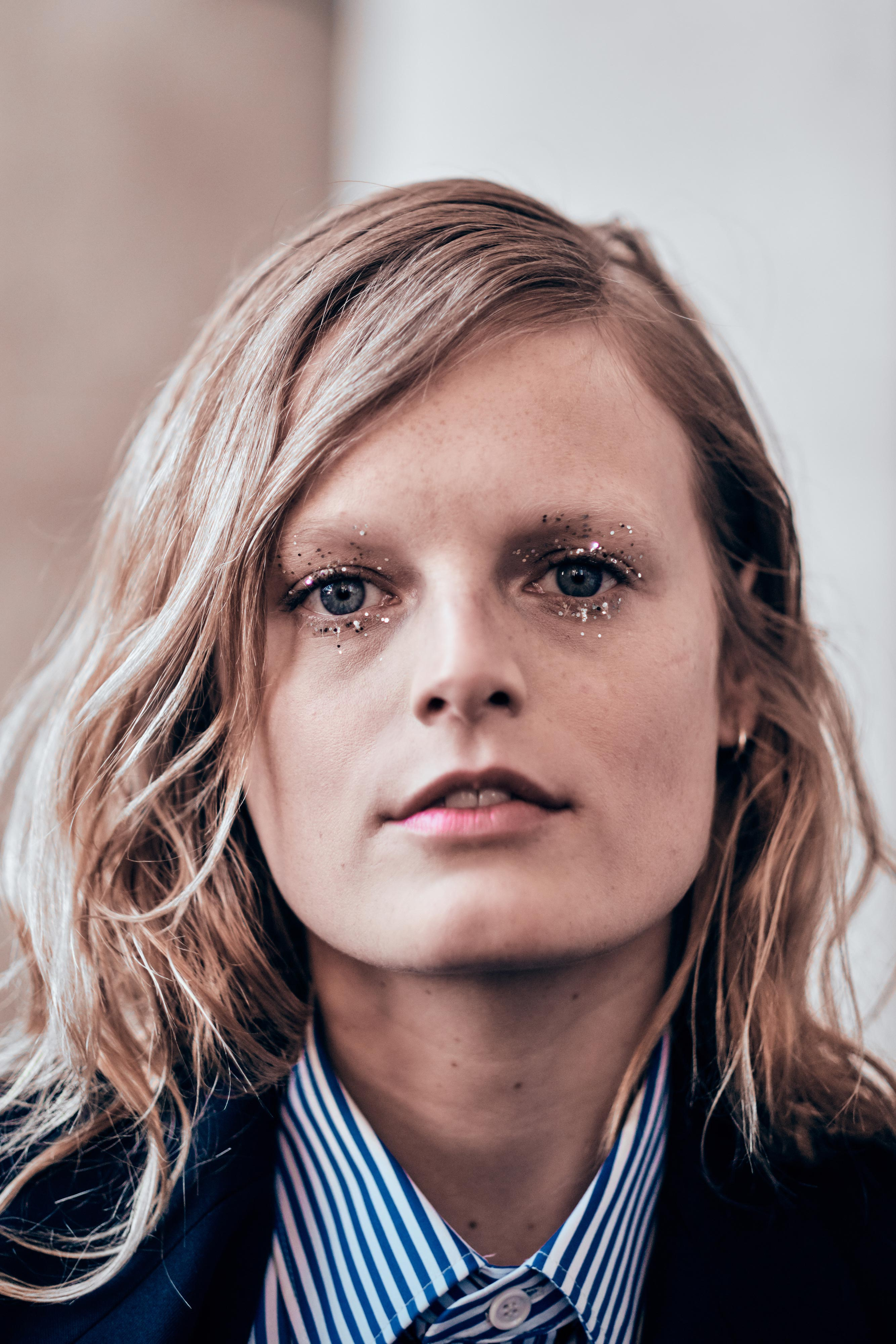
- Odiele in 2019
- Born: 8 October 1988 (age 38); Kortrijk, Belgium
- Spouse: John Swiatek (m. 2016)
- Modeling information
- Height: 1.78 m (5 ft 10 in)
- Hair color: Blonde
- Eye color: Blue
- Agency: Women Management (New York, Paris, Milan); The Squad (London); Dominique Models (Brussels); UNIQUE DENMARK (Copenhagen); Modellink (Gothenburg); Place Models (Hamburg); MP Stockholm (Stockholm); Donna Models (Tokyo)

Hanne Gaby Odiele (born 8 October 1988) is a Belgian model.

== Early life ==
Odiele was born on 8 October 1988 in Kortrijk, Belgium. They were born with an unspecified variant of androgen insensitivity syndrome.

As a child, Odiele underwent medical procedures relating to their condition, which they said took place without their or their parents' informed consent. Odiele was told that they had androgen insensitivity syndrome weeks before beginning their modelling career.

== Career ==
Odiele was noticed by Tom Van Dorpe while attending the Novarock rock festival in Kortrijk, Belgium. In 2005, Odiele signed with Supreme Management in New York City. In September, Odiele made their debut on the runways, walking for Marc by Marc Jacobs, Rodarte, Ruffian, and Thakoon in New York. In 2006, they appeared in features for Vogue and became the face of Philosophy di Alberta Ferretti.

In December 2006, a motorist ran a red light and broke Odiele's arms and legs. After multiple surgeries and several months of intense physical therapy, Odiele was back on the catwalk in Spring and Fall 2008 shows, walking for Chanel, Givenchy, Prada, and others.

Odiele has been in magazines such Vogue Italia, Marie Claire, Teen Vogue, and Elle. Odiele has appeared on the cover of Vogue and French Revue de Modes. Odiele has booked some of the industry's most lucrative campaigns, including those for Mulberry, Balenciaga, Anna Sui, Vera Wang, and DKNY Jeans.

Odiele is currently represented by Women Management in New York, Milan and Paris.

== Personal life ==
Odiele lives in Williamsburg, Brooklyn in New York City. Odiele married model John Swiatek in 2016.

After publicly disclosing their intersex status in 2017, Odiele partnered with interACT to advocate for intersex human rights. In the same year, in interviews with The Times and Dazed, Odiele described their identity as an intersex woman, and their desire for an intersex community. In 2019, Odiele came out as non-binary in Flemish newspaper De Morgen. Odiele uses they/them pronouns in English and hen/hun in Dutch.
