= Intersex Asia =

Intersex rights organization (est. 2018)

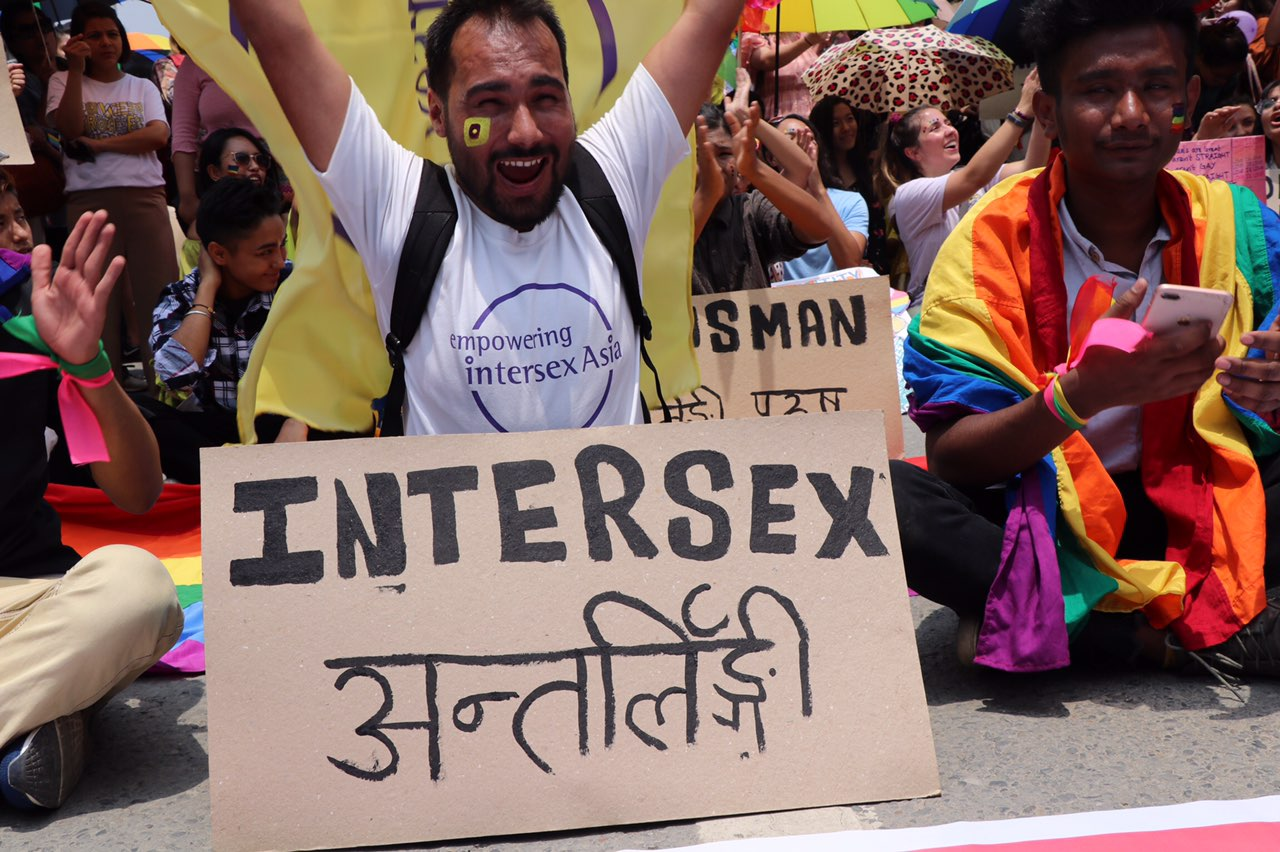
- Intersex Asia activist Esan Regmi at first Nepal Pride Parade
- Formation: 2018
- Type: NGO
- Purpose: Intersex human rights advocacy and support
- Headquarters: Taiwan
- Region served: Asia
- Notable board members: Jeff Cagandahan, Hiker Chiu, Esan Regmi, Small Luk and Gopi Shankar Madurai
- Website: intersexasia.org

Intersex Asia is a pan-Asian intersex human rights organization, established in 2018 and registered in Taiwan.

== History ==
Intersex Asia was established at the First Asian Intersex Forum on February 10, 2018, in Bangkok, Thailand. The forum brought together 14 people from Hong Kong (China), India, Indonesia, Myanmar, Nepal, Pakistan, Philippines, Taiwan, Thailand and Vietnam. Notable representatives and spokespeople include Jeff Cagandahan, Hiker Chiu, Esan Regmi, Small Luk and Gopi Shankar Madurai. Indian human rights lawyer Prashant Singh has been appointed as coordinator.

== Activities ==
Intersex Asia aims to promote and protect the human rights of intersex people in Asia, including rights to bodily integrity, physical autonomy and self determination, and it also aims to provide a representative voice. In a founding statement the organization identifies key issues including "discrimination, violence and killings of intersex people by a number of cultural, religious, traditional and medical beliefs and practices". The organization is supported by Astraea Lesbian Foundation for Justice, COC, Mama Cash, Open Society Foundations and RFSL.

=== Education and awareness ===
Amongst its activities, Intersex Asia has published translations of information on key issues and human rights by United Nations Free & Equal into Asian languages including Arabic, Bengali, Chinese, Filipino, Hindi, Indonesian, Korean, Malay, Nepali, Tamil, Telugu, Urdu and Vietnamese.

== Affiliations ==
Intersex Asia is a member of the International Lesbian, Gay, Bisexual, Trans and Intersex Association.

== See also ==
- Intersex human rights
