= Jeff Cagandahan =

Filipino intersex activist

- Born: Jennifer Cagandahan; Pakil, Laguna, Philippines
- Occupation: Co-chair of Intersex Asia
- Known for: Intersex human rights activist
- Website: intersexasia.org

Jeff Cagandahan is a prominent Filipino intersex man and intersex human rights activist. Raised female and diagnosed with congenital adrenal hyperplasia, Cagandahan successfully petitioned the Philippine courts to change name and sex markers, becoming the first person to win such a case.

== Early life ==
While observed as female at birth, as Cagandahan grew, male characteristics developed, causing discomfort and experiences of stigma at school and work. Cagandahan failed to develop breasts or menstruate, and male characteristics dominated. He graduated with a Bachelor in Physical Education and became a teacher. He found information about congenital adrenal hyperplasia while reading in his workplace library, sought a diagnosis and received one at the Philippine General Hospital at age 22.

== Republic v. Jennifer B. Cagandahan ==
Due to embarrassment and discrimination, Cagandahan sought to amend the sex in his birth certificate. Cagandahan filed a petition for a correction to his birth certificate on December 11, 2003, later presenting medical testimony in support of the petition. The petition was granted on January 12, 2005. The case was appealed by the Office of the Solicitor General, on the basis that court rules were not complied with, and the statement that congenital adrenal hyperplasia did not make Cagandahan male. On September 12, 2008, the Supreme Court of the Philippines approved a correction to his birth certificate, including a change of gender and a change of name.

The Supreme Court opined that he had "allowed 'nature to take its course' and had not interfered with what 'he was born with'" but also accepted a role for self-determination. The court opined:

Ultimately, we are of the view that where the person is biologically or naturally intersex the determining factor in his gender classification would be what the individual, like respondent, having reached the age of majority, with good reason thinks of his/her sex... Respondent is the one who has to live with his intersex anatomy. To him belongs the human right to the pursuit of happiness and of health. Thus, to him should belong the primordial choice of what courses of action to take along the path of his sexual development and maturation.

The case made Cagandahan the first Filipino legally permitted to change name and gender markers.

== Activism ==
Cagandahan became an advocate as a "mission to help others". He promotes intersex community development in the Philippines, stating that intersex people are not cursed and "should not be ashamed of who they are". He has also called for a "broadening" of the LGBT community, which "presupposes their inclusion, and yet fails to recognize their existence by adding them in the 'rainbow acronym'". He states that intersex people in the Philippines face specific issues, including the affordability of medication and healthcare, lack of information, and lack of acceptance.

Cagandahan has helped to create a national intersex organization, Intersex Philippines, and also participated in the Asian Intersex Forum in 2018 which established Intersex Asia. He is currently a board member of Intersex Asia.

Cagandahan organized the 1st Philippines National Intersex Forum in November 2019 supported by Intersex Asia and COC Nederland.

== See also ==
- Mely Silverio, a transgender Filipina woman who was denied recognition of her gender
