= Esan Regmi =

Prominent Nepali Intersex man and Intersex Human Rights Activist

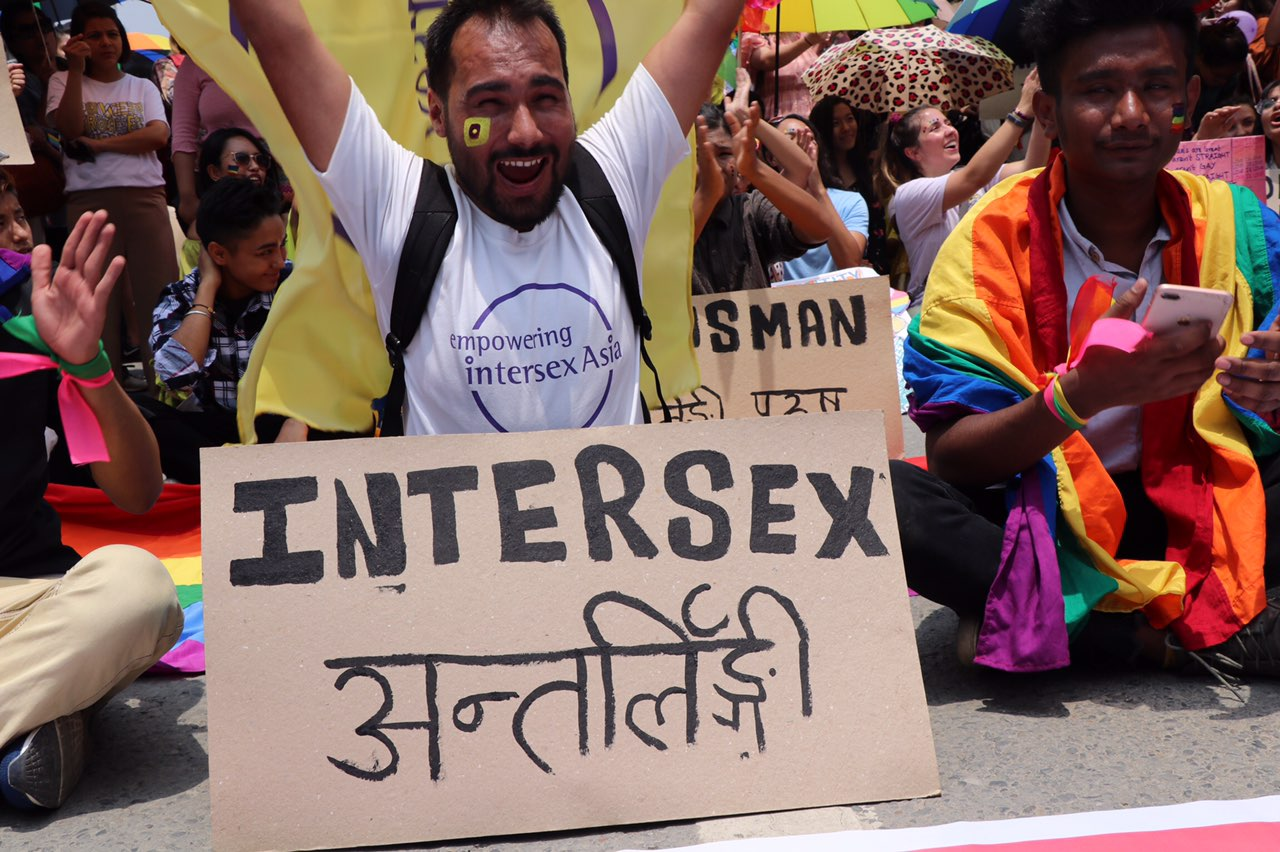
- Regmi at the first Nepal Pride Parade
- Born: 1988 (age 37–38); Nepal
- Occupations: Executive Director of Campaign for Change, and Chair of Intersex Asia
- Known for: Intersex activist
- Website: nepalcfc.org and intersexasia.org

Esan Regmi (born 1988) is a prominent Nepali intersex man and intersex human rights activist. He founded Nepal's first and only intersex-led organization called Campaign for Change in 2017, and he is one of the co founders of International NGO Intersex Asia.

== Early life ==
Regmi was born in Bajura, Nepal, in 1988. He describes the region around Bajura as remote, mountainous, and conservative. Regmi was raised female but developed male characteristics during puberty, resulting in stigma, discrimination and claims of 'fake' identity in education and employment.

He described travelling to India for medical treatment, and discussion about being sent to be part of a kinnar or hijra community. Regmi was loved by his family, and studied at home, but his mental health suffered.

After his father passed away around 2004, he struggled to continue his studies. In 2008, Regmi was offered a scholarship by an organization called Rest Nepal. While he initially was hesitant to disclose that he was intersex, he eventually told the organization, who continued their support for him. As a result, he completed his higher education and was able to become a teacher.

== Activism ==
Regmi became an intersex human rights activist in 2011, initially with Blue Diamond Society after being introduced by Rest Nepal organizers. Later, he established Campaign for Change and jointly established Intersex Asia. He organized and led first national workshop for intersex people in 2016, supported by the UNDP.

Regmi has worked with Zwischengeschlecht on submissions to the United Nations leading to calls for change to medical and social systems in Nepal, including raising intersex issues on UN mechanism CRC in 2016 and CEDAW in 2018. He speaks nationally and internationally on intersex rights.

As of 2020, Regmi was the Executive Director for Campaign for Change and the Co-Chair of Intersex Asia. In 2025, Regmi was elected as Chair of Intersex Asia.

== Selected bibliography ==
- Regmi, Esan (July 20, 2019). "The 'other' in the spectrum". The Kathmandu Post.
- Regmi, Esan (2016). Stories of Intersex People from Nepal (PDF). Kathmandu.
