= Oii-Chinese =

Intersex advocacy and support group

OII-Chinese 國際陰陽人組織 — 中文版
- Abbreviation: Oii-Chinese
- Formation: 8 November 2008
- Type: NGO
- Purpose: Intersex human rights
- Region served: East Asia
- Affiliations: Organisation Intersex International
- Website: oii.tw

Oii-Chinese (國際陰陽人組織 — 中文版) is an intersex advocacy and support group and the Chinese-language affiliate of Organisation Intersex International. Oii-Chinese, founded by Hiker Chiu in 2008, is active in Taiwan, Hong Kong, and other areas in East Asia.

== Mission and activities ==
The organisation aims to end "normalising" surgeries on intersex children, promote awareness of intersex issues, and improve government recognition of gender. Chiu says that surgical "normalisation" practices began in Taiwan in 1953. As part of this mission, Chiu started a "free hugs with intersex" campaign at Taipei's LGBT Pride Parade in 2010. The organisation also gives lectures and lobbies government.

== Affiliations ==
Oii-Chinese is affiliated to Organisation Intersex International and a member of the International Lesbian, Gay, Bisexual, Trans and Intersex Association (ILGBTIA). In 2015, Chiu was elected to the board of the ILGBTIA to represent ILGA Asia.

== See also ==
- Intersex human rights
- Intersex rights in China
