= Small Luk =

Chinese intersex rights activist (born 1966)

Small Ela Luk
- 陸耀鴻
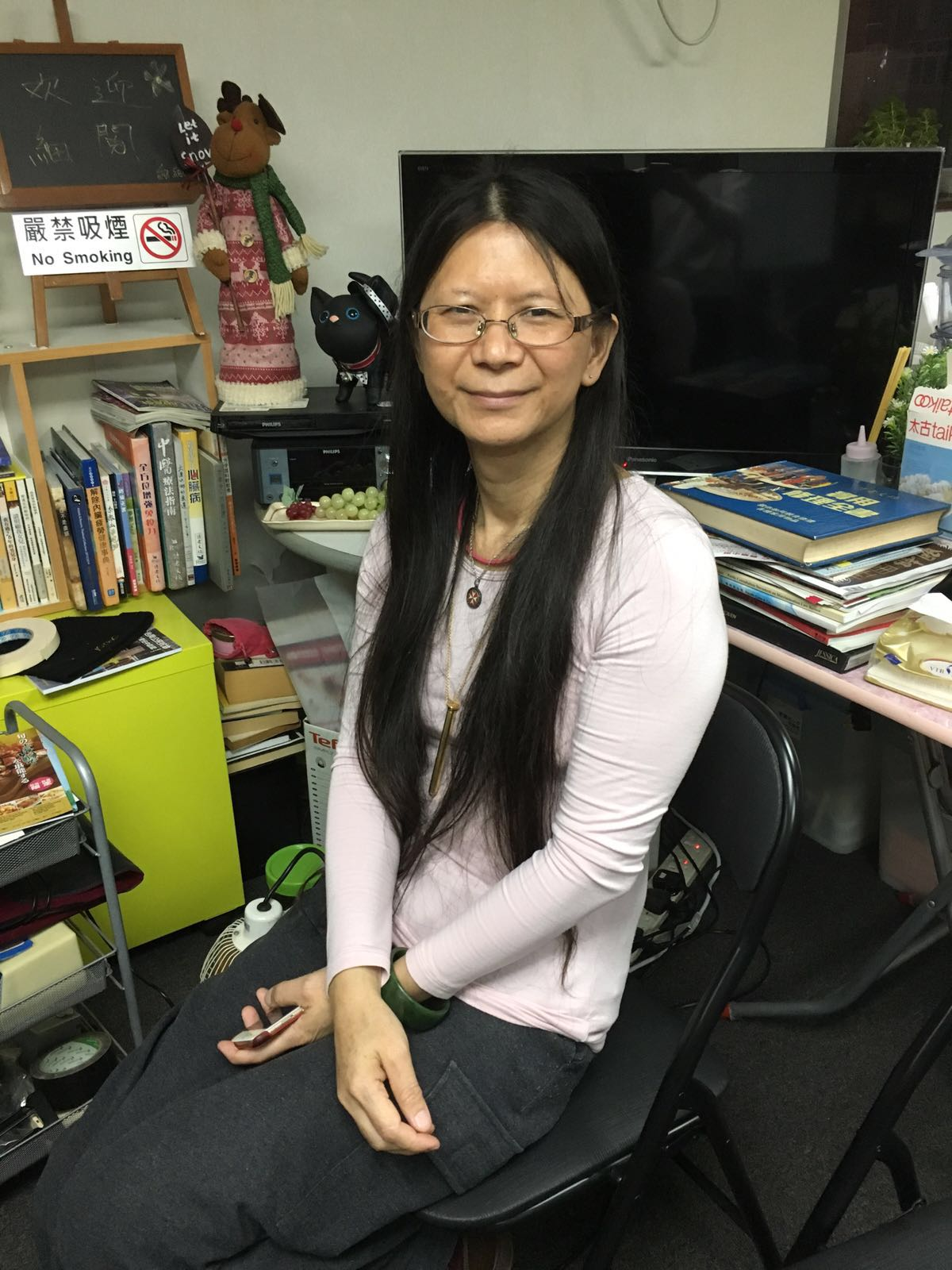
- Born: Luk Yiu-hung; 1966 (age 59–60); British Hong Kong
- Education: Chinese University of Hong Kong
- Known for: Intersex activist and doctor of Chinese medicine

Small Ela Luk (Chinese: 陸耀鴻; born 1966) is a Chinese intersex human rights activist and the first intersex person to openly acknowledge her biological sex characteristics in Hong Kong. She was born with partial androgen insensitivity syndrome (PAIS). Luk lived as a male for 36 years, and now identifies and lives as a woman, after changing her sex characteristics from intersex to female through gender-affirming surgery, upon doctors' advice to undergo the surgery because her type of PAIS would most likely have caused cancer.

She founded the organization "Beyond Boundaries – Knowing and Concerns Intersex" in 2011, which is concerned with, and strives for, the rights of intersex people.

== Background ==
Small Luk was the first child of her family. When Luk was born, the doctor found that she was intersex, with organs resembling testicles and a penis. Luk was deemed male and underwent more than 20 operations between the ages of 8 and 13 to construct a urethra – the duct that conducts urine from the bladder. When she was 12, the surgery failed. Luk found the surgery too unbearable and attempted suicide several times. News records state that Luk was the only surviving person among the seven people who were operated on as children at Hong Kong's Kwong Wah Hospital in the 1970s to "fix" their anatomies. After surgery at the age of 13, Luk refused further genital reconstruction.

During adolescence, Luk developed breasts, suffered menstrual cramps, and saw blood in her urine. Doctors explained that her body did not respond to androgen and found undeveloped uterus and vagina in her body. Luk eventually underwent surgery to remove her male genitalia, and now lives as a woman.

Apart from the surgical pain, Luk also suffered from bullying. Luk was at the receiving end of discrimination from classmates and teachers.

== Education ==
Despite the past, Luk has completed her education, earning degrees in social work and traditional Chinese medicine, as well as a master's in gender studies at Chinese University of Hong Kong. She now runs a holistic treatment clinic in Hong Kong.

== Advocacy ==
Small Luk founded the organization "Beyond Boundaries– Knowing and Concerns Intersex" in 2011, and it has been working to spread awareness about intersex people. The aims of the organization are to raise public awareness about intersex people and promote the rights of intersex people, including ending forced genital normalising surgery and conversion therapies. Luk urges the Hong Kong government to educate the public about intersex conditions, extend anti-discrimination laws to cover intersex people and stop foisting surgery on intersex children without consulting them. Luk has been invited to various international and local events, including the United Nations meeting in Thailand, to speak on the issue of intersex people and their rights. In 2018, she participated in the forum where NGO Intersex Asia was founded.

Though Luk has chosen to live as a woman, she has said "I don’t really feel I’m a female. I’m intersex."
