= Hiker Chiu =

Intersex activist

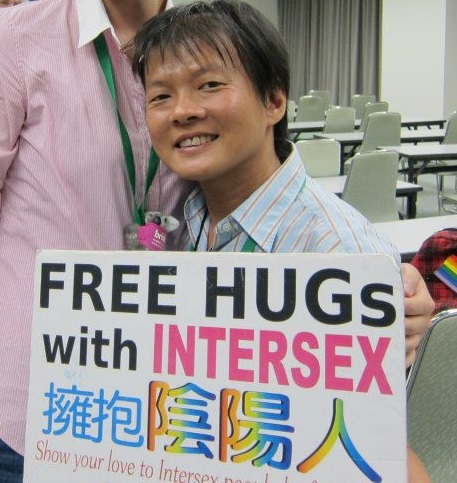
- Hiker Chiu and their "Global Free Hugs with Intersex" movement
- Born: 1966 (age 59–60)
- Known for: Intersex activist and educator, founder of Oii-Chinese

Hiker Chiu (Chinese: 丘愛芝; born 1966) is a Taiwanese intersex human rights activist who founded Oii-Chinese in 2008 and cofounded Intersex Asia in 2018.

== Early life ==
Chiu did not fully develop the secondary sexual characteristics expected of women during their adolescent years. Upon viewing their medical records, they discovered that a physician had described their condition, in English, as a "pseudo hermaphrodite." Chiu felt that this description made them a "monster." Chiu asked their parents about their condition. They stated that they were both male and female with "two sets." Chiu did not learn about the word intersex until viewing the film XXY in 2008, and after they reread their medical files regarding surgical and hormonal treatment performed in their early years.

== Activism ==
Through Oii-Chinese organisation aims to end "normalising" surgeries on intersex children, promote awareness of intersex issues, and improve government recognition of gender. The organisation also gives lectures and lobbies government. As part of this mission, Chiu started a "free hugs with intersex" campaign at Taiwan Pride in 2010. This was also the first time Chiu appeared in public as an intersex person.

Chiu participated in the first International Intersex Forum in 2011, including as a spokesperson. In 2015, Chiu joined an international advisory board for a first philanthropic Intersex Human Rights Fund established by the Astraea Lesbian Foundation for Justice. In the same year, Chiu was elected to the board of the International Lesbian, Gay, Bisexual, Trans and Intersex Association, representing ILGA Asia.

Chiu is a co-founder of Intersex Asia, established in 2018.

== Education ==
Taipei Municipal Fuxing High School (臺北市立復興高級中學)

Fu Jen University (輔仁大學), Department of English Language and Literature

Graduate Institute of Somatology and Life Studies, Fo Guang University (佛光大學, 生命學研究所)
