= Mely Silverio =

Filipino transgender woman (born 1962)

- Born: April 4, 1962 (age 64); Manila, Philippines
- Education: University of the Philippines; University of Hawaiʻi
- Known for: Silverio v. Republic gender recognition case

Mely Dantes Silverio is a transgender Filipina woman who was involved in a high-profile legal case to have her gender recognized by the Philippine government.

== Early life and education ==
Mely Silverio was born in Manila to Melcio Petines Silverio and Anita Aquino Dantes on April 4, 1962, under a different given name. Assigned male at birth, Silverio maintained she is transgender and had more affinity in socializing with girls and playing games and toys often viewed as feminine.

Silverio attended the University of the Philippines where she obtained a bachelor's degree in statistics and a masters of arts degree. She went to the United States to study at the University of Hawaiʻi where she obtained a master's degree in sociology and a doctorate degree in sociology and philosophy.

== Gender transition ==
Silverio began the process of gender transition while she was in the United States undergoing psychological examinations with several doctors. She underwent hormone replacement therapy and breast augmentation. With doctors in the States concluding she was ready for sex reassignement surgery (SAS), she then went to Thailand for further procedures in 2001. A plastic surgeon in the Philippines issued a certificate to declare her SAS was a success.

== Gender recognition case ==
Silverio sought to have her gender recognized by the Filipino government. She filed a petition in a court in Manila to have her sex marker changed from male to female in her birth certificate. She maintained that the decision was not intended to evade any law or obligation, and that she was of good moral character and had not been indicted or convicted of any offense. Despite being assigned male on birth, Silverio maintained that she "feels, thinks and acts as a female". She argued recognition of her gender was to "avoid confusion" to the public since she presented female. The argument is listed as a valid reason to modify one's birth certificate in Republic Act No. 9048.

The regional trial court in Manila issued a favorable ruling to Silverio on June 4, 2003. It was granted on the basis of equity and not a specific substantial law. However, the Office of the Solicitor General (OSG) contested the decision and in 2006, the Court of Appeals (CA) reversed the decision believing that there was no legal basis for the recognition and that physical transitioning was not a sufficient basis. The CA also accepted the OSG's argument that the Manila court had no jurisdiction over the case as Silverio had been a resident of Quezon City for more than five years prior to the filing of petition.

Silverio elevated the case to the Supreme Court. However, the High Court under Chief Justice Renato Corona affirmed the CA reversal on October 22, 2007. The Corona court disagreed with Silverio's arguments that granting the petition would cause more "confusion" to the civil registry and public interest, and maintained that there was no existing law to grant Silverio the relief she sought. The decision also makes reference to the Book of Genesis in the Bible which insisted on the viewpoint that there are only two sexes.

Silverio vs. Republic was a landmark ruling. Prior to the Supreme Court decision, transgender Filipino citizens were able to get their gender recognized via R.A. 9048.

== Personal life ==
At the time of the filing of the petition, Silverio was engaged to a man.

== See also ==
- Jeff Cagandahan, an intersex Filipino man assigned female at birth who had his gender legally recognised
