= Nepal Pride Parade =

LGBTQ event in Nepal

Nepal Pride Parade नेपाल गौरव यात्रा
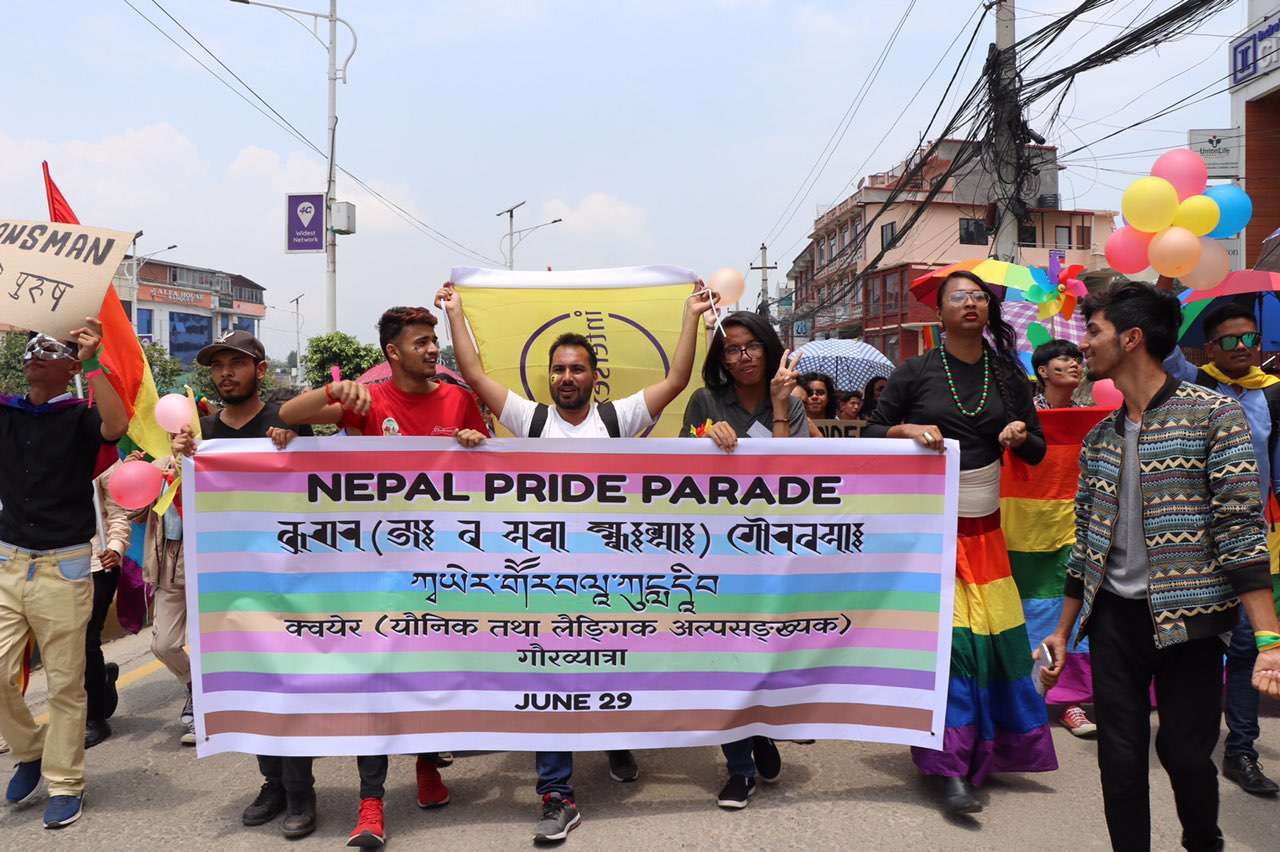
- The first ever Pride March in Nepal
- Status: active
- Genre: Pride Parade
- Frequency: Annual, Second Saturday of June
- Location: Kathmandu
- Inaugurated: June 29, 2019, the other day of the Stonewall Riot anniversary
- Previous event: 2022 June 11
- Next event: 2023 June 10
- Organizer: Queer Youth Group and Queer Rights Collective, Campaign for Change (since 2020)
- Website: www.nepalprideparade.org

Nepal POMSOGIESC (People of Marginalized Sexual Orientation, Gender Identity and Sex Characteristics) Pride Parade (Nepali: नेपाल सिमान्तकृत यौन अभिमुखिकरण, लैङ्गिक पहिचान र यौन विशेषताका व्यक्तिहरूको गौरव यात्रा, romanized: Nēpāla Simāntakr̥ta Yauna Abhimukhikaraṇa, Laiṅgika Pahicāna ra Yauna Viśēṣatākā Vyaktiharūkō Gaurava Yātrā) known as Nepal Pride Parade (नेपाल गौरव यात्रा, Nēpāla Gaurava Yātrā) in short, (Note: Nepali: नेपाल गौरव यात्रा, pronounced [ˈnepal ˈɡʌu̯ɾʌb ˈjat̪ra]; Maithili: 𑒢𑒹𑒣𑒰𑒪 𑒑𑒾𑒩𑒫 𑒨𑒰𑒞𑓂𑒩𑒰, pronounced [ˈneːpaːlᵊ ˈɡəʊ̯ɾəʋᵊ ˈjaːt̪ɾaː]; Newar: 𑐣𑐾𑐥𑐵𑑅 𑐎𑐸𑐊𑐬 𑐐𑑁𑐬𑐧𑐫𑐵𑑅, pronounced [ˈnepaː ˈkueɾə ˈɡəuɾəbəjaː]; Tamang: ནེཔཱལ་གཽརབལཱ་ཀུངླདཱིབ; Gurung: नेपाल ङ्होईल्वुबये भ्रज्ञाँ; Limbu: ᤏᤣᤐᤠᤗ ᤜᤣᤴᤇᤠᤶ ᤋᤱᤏᤠᤔ, pronounced [neˈpalɔ ˈhenˌtɕʰam ˈtɔŋˌnamɔ]) is organized on every second Saturday of June. The Pride March is organized by Queer Youth Group in collaboration with Queer Rights Collective. Since 2020, Campaign for Change (intersex rights organization) has also been involved. This Pride March marked the establishment of the first independent Pride Parade in Nepal.

== 2022 ==
The fourth annual Nepal Pride Parade was conducted in physical attendance after two years of virtual events. The parade participants gathered at Fibwakhya (Maitighar) and their march concluded at New Baneshwar. There were speeches in multiple indigenous languages with sign language interpretation.

== 2021 ==
The third annual Nepal Pride Parade was also conducted virtually. Events included:-

- Social Media Posting (Before 1 pm)
- Tweetathon and Instathon (11 am to 12:30 pm)
- Video Screening (1 pm to 3 pm)
- Networking Event (3:30 pm to 4:30 pm)
- Dance Party (5 pm to 6 pm)

== 2020 ==
Due to the COVID-19 pandemic the second annual Nepal Pride Parade was conducted online. The day started with Tweetathon & Instathon that led to virtual sessions being conducted. Events included:-

- Video Posting "What is Pride for you?" (Before 11 am)
- Tweetathon and Instathon (11 am to 1 pm)
- Mental Health and Us : Webinar (1:30 pm to 2:45 pm)
- Intersectionality in the Queer Movement : Webinar (3 pm to 4:30 pm)
- Networking Event (5 pm to 7pm)

== 2019 ==
The first parade drew around four hundred people on the busy streets of Maitighar Mandala. The first pride march was organized on June 29, 2019, which declared second Saturday of June to be celebrated as Pride Day in Nepal.

In 2019, people gathered at Maitighar Mandala (Fibwa Khya) in the morning and marched towards New Baneshwar (Khunthoo). Around 400 people showed up. People held Rainbow Pride Flag, Bisexual Pride Flag, Transgender Pride Flag, Genderqueer Pride Flag, Genderfluid Pride Flag, Intersex Pride Flag along with slogans in four different languages. The theme of the pride march was 'Inclusion of queer (gender and sexual minorities) at all levels of state and decision-making process.

== Gallery ==
=== Nepal Pride Parade, 2019 ===
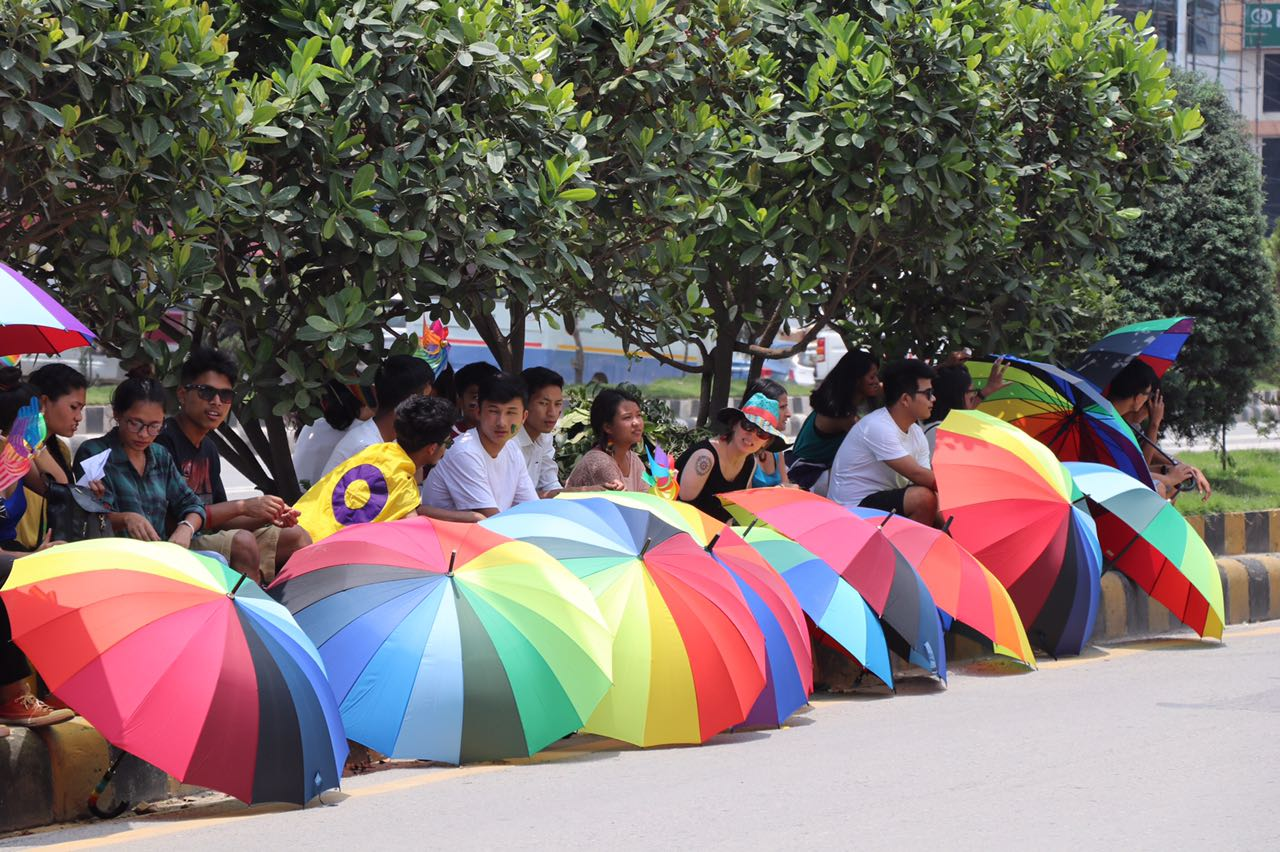

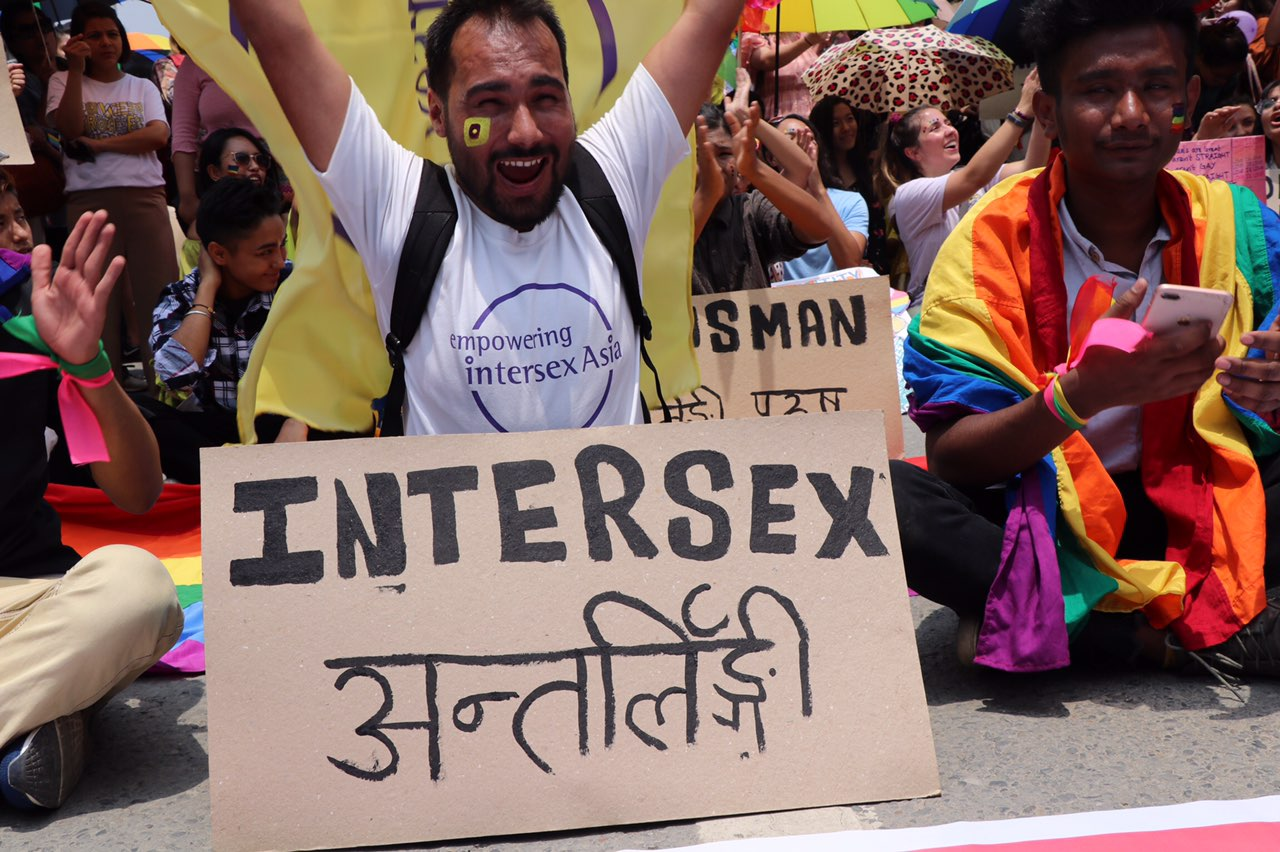

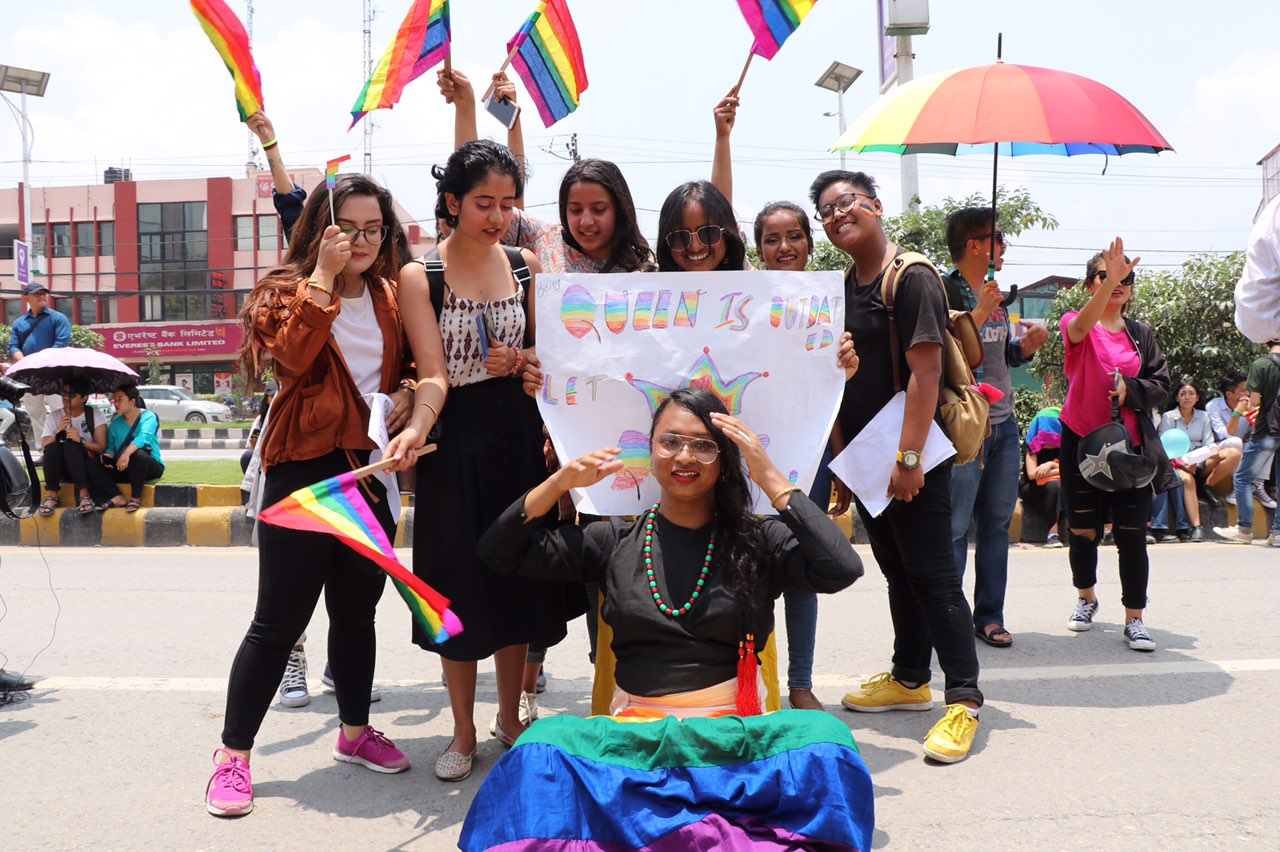

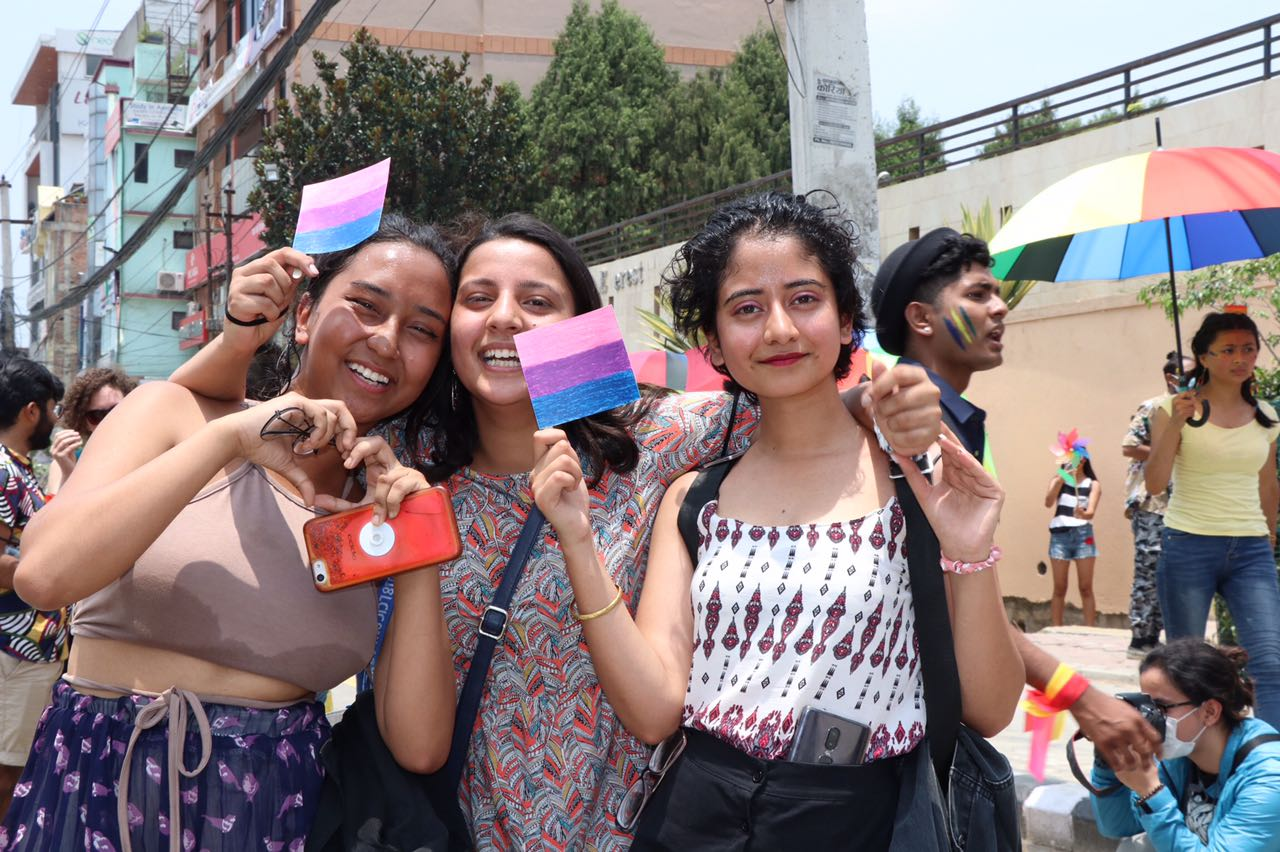

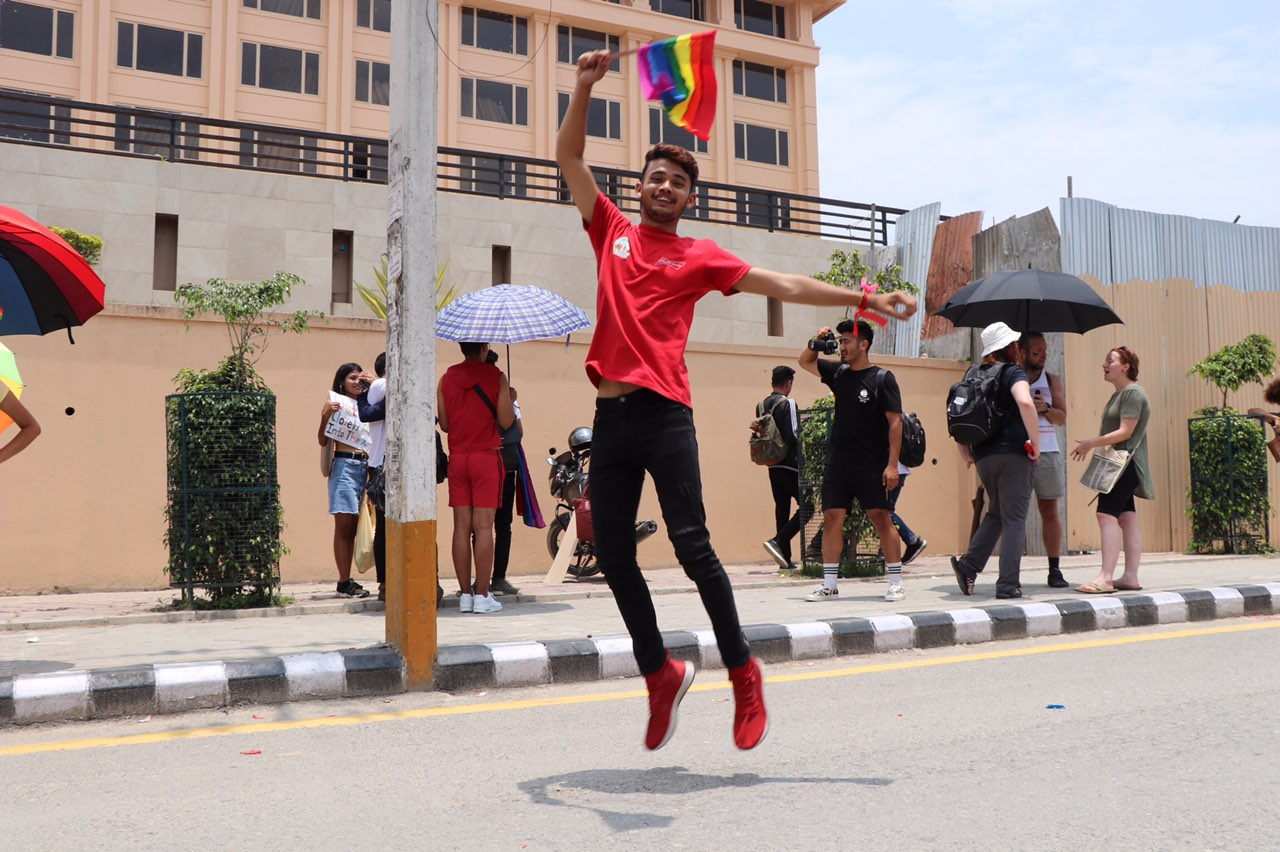

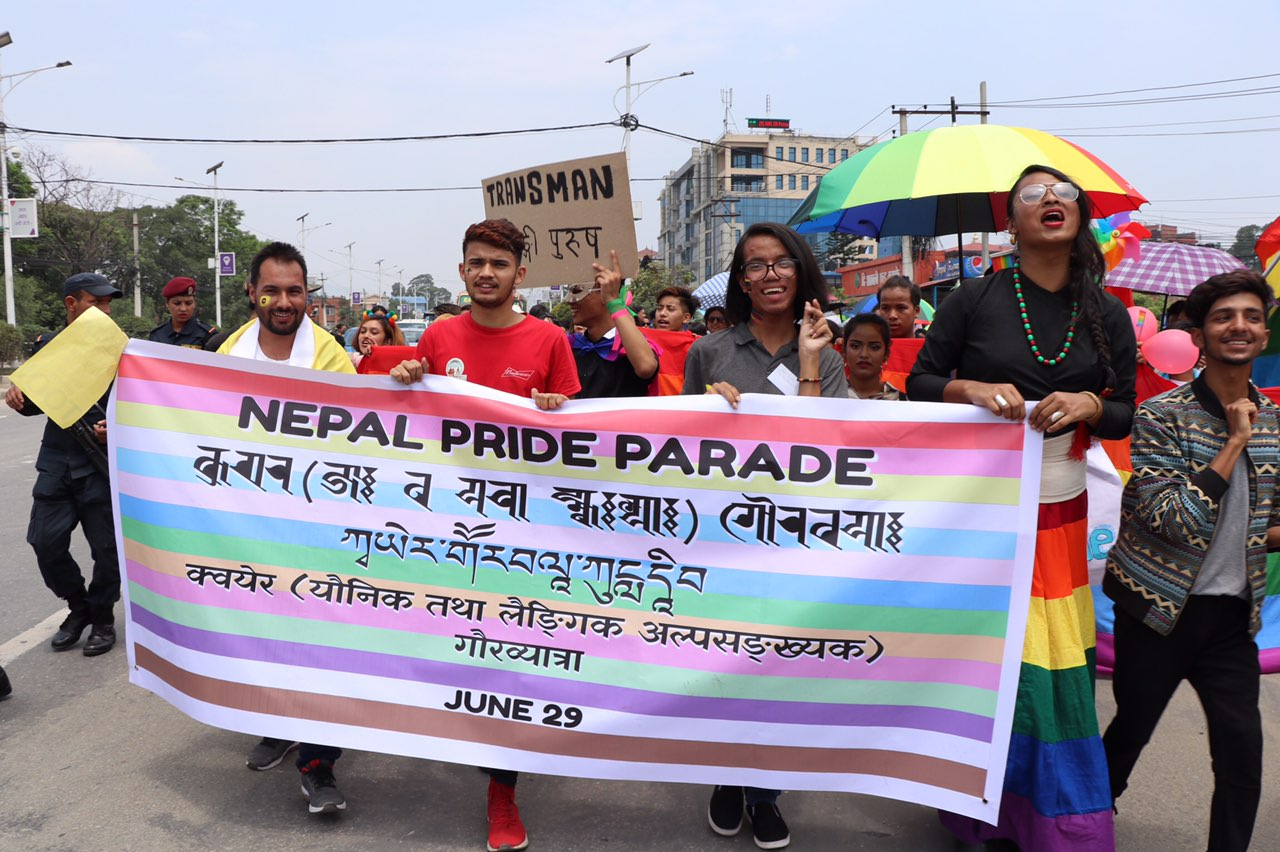

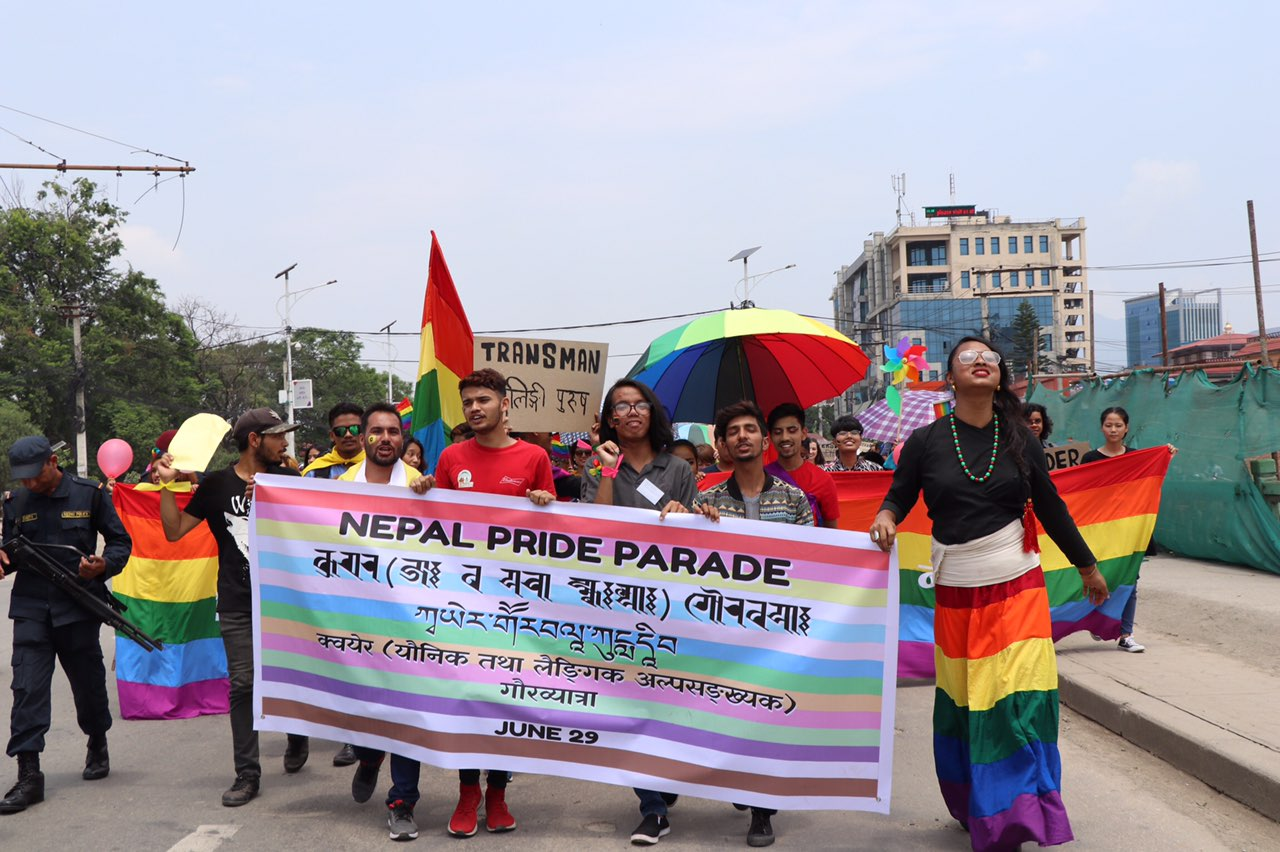

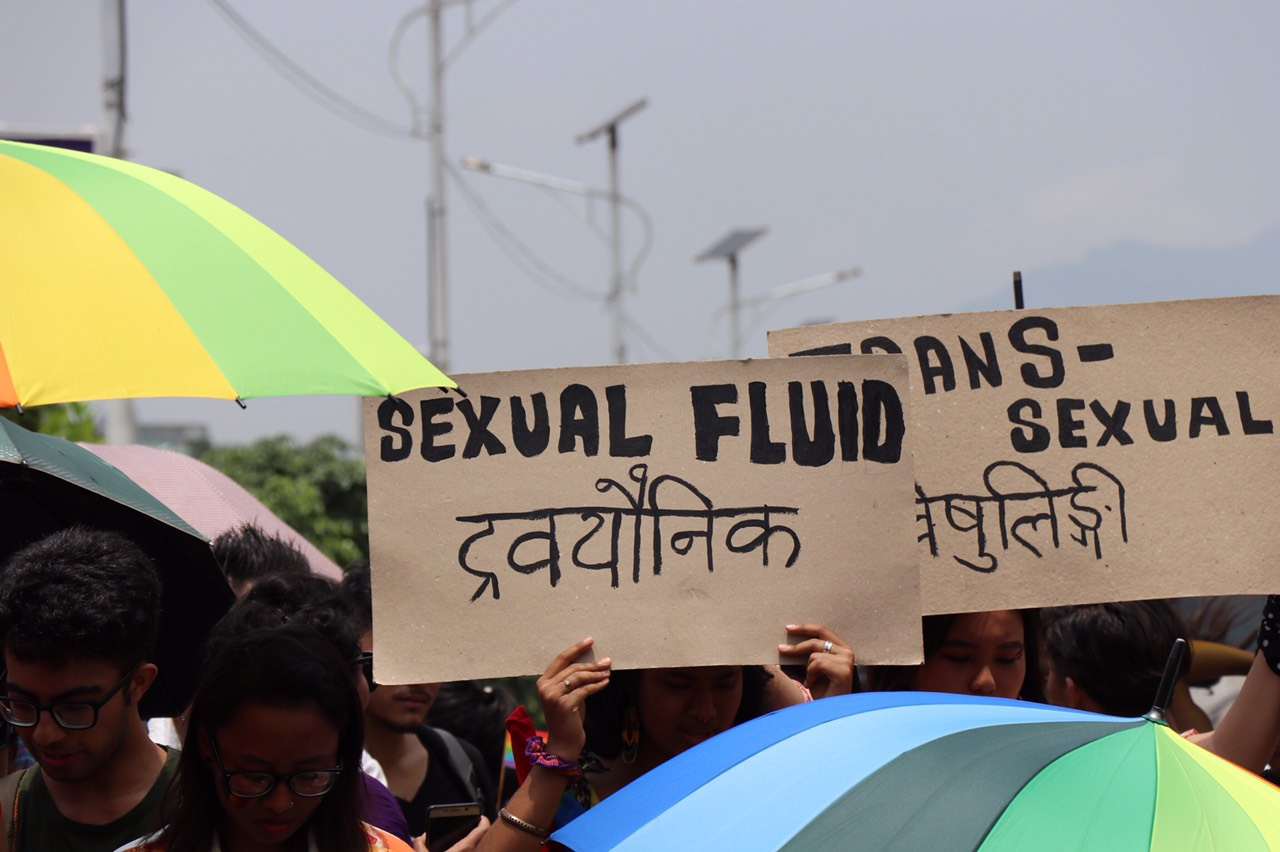

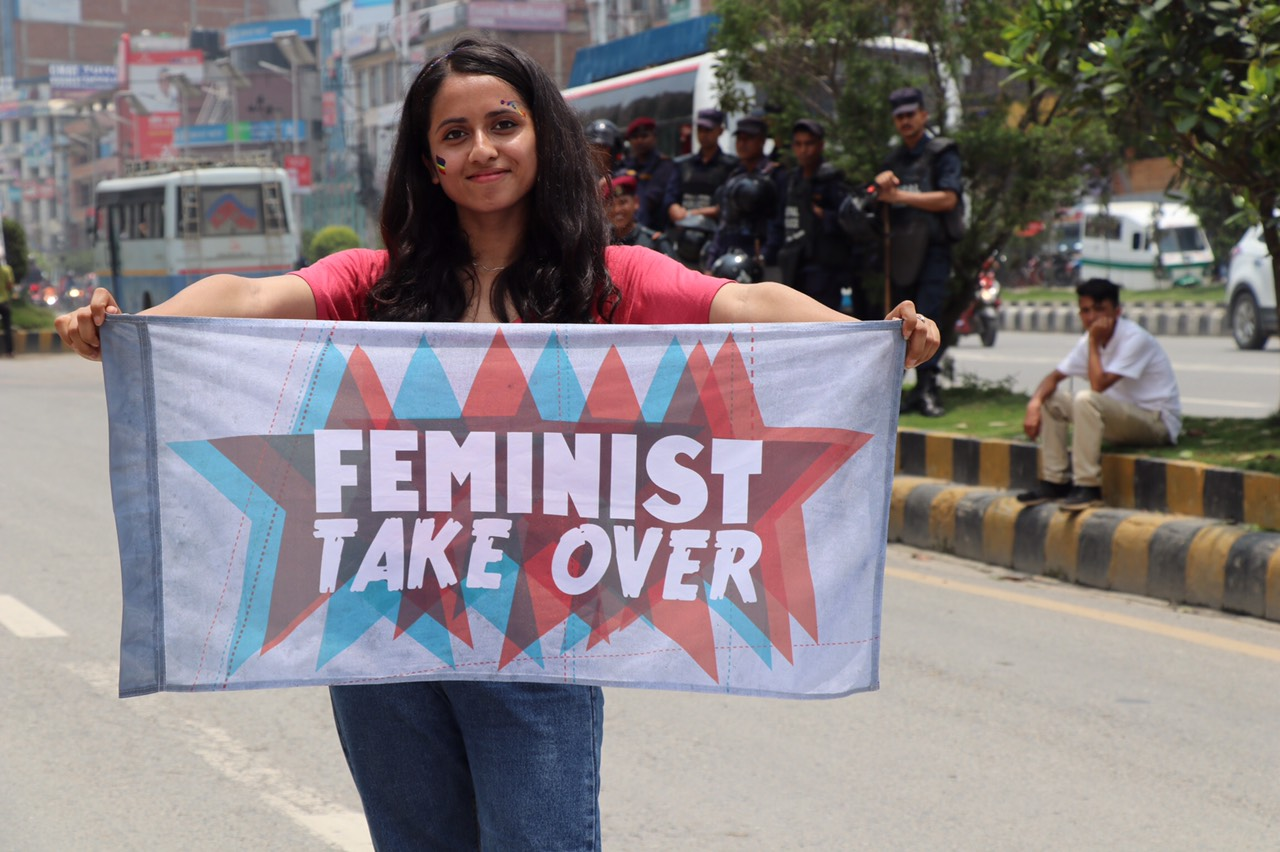

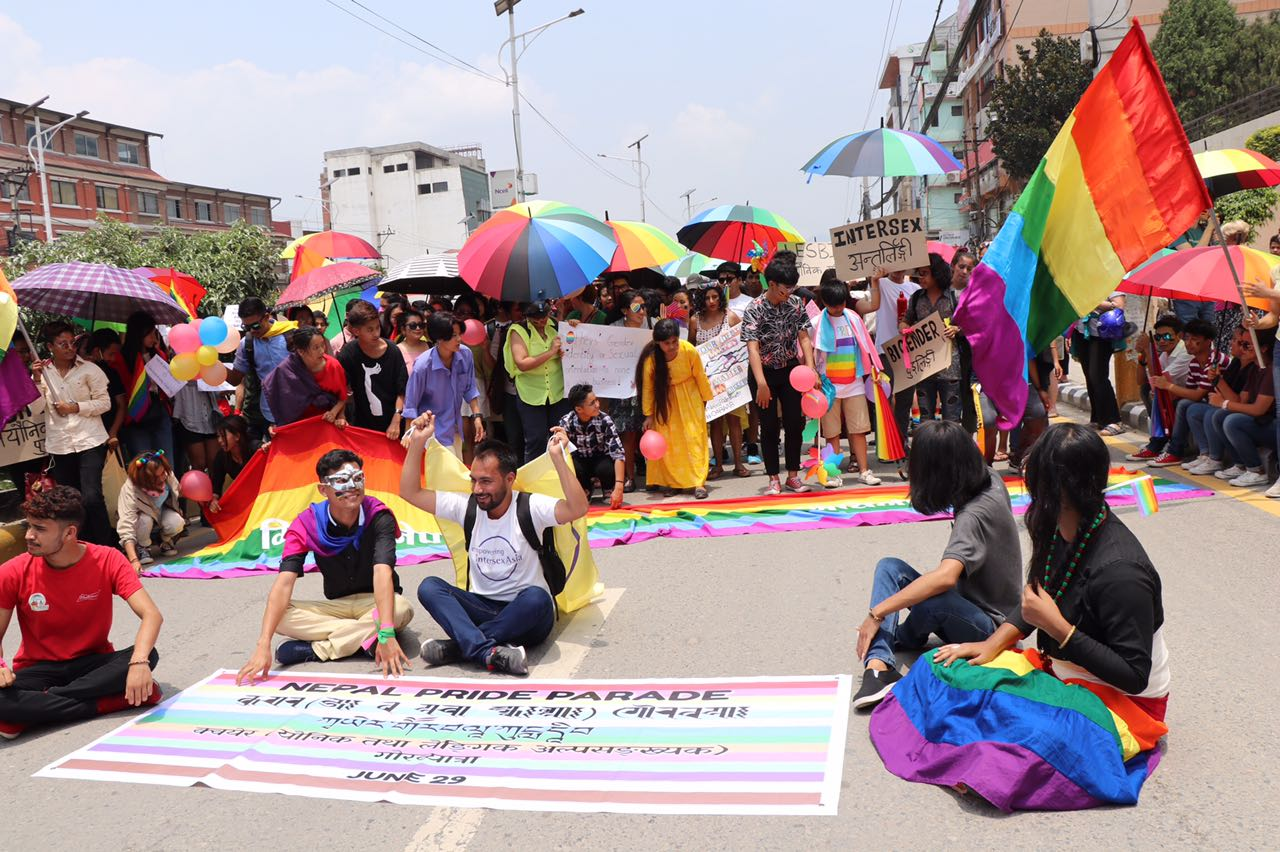

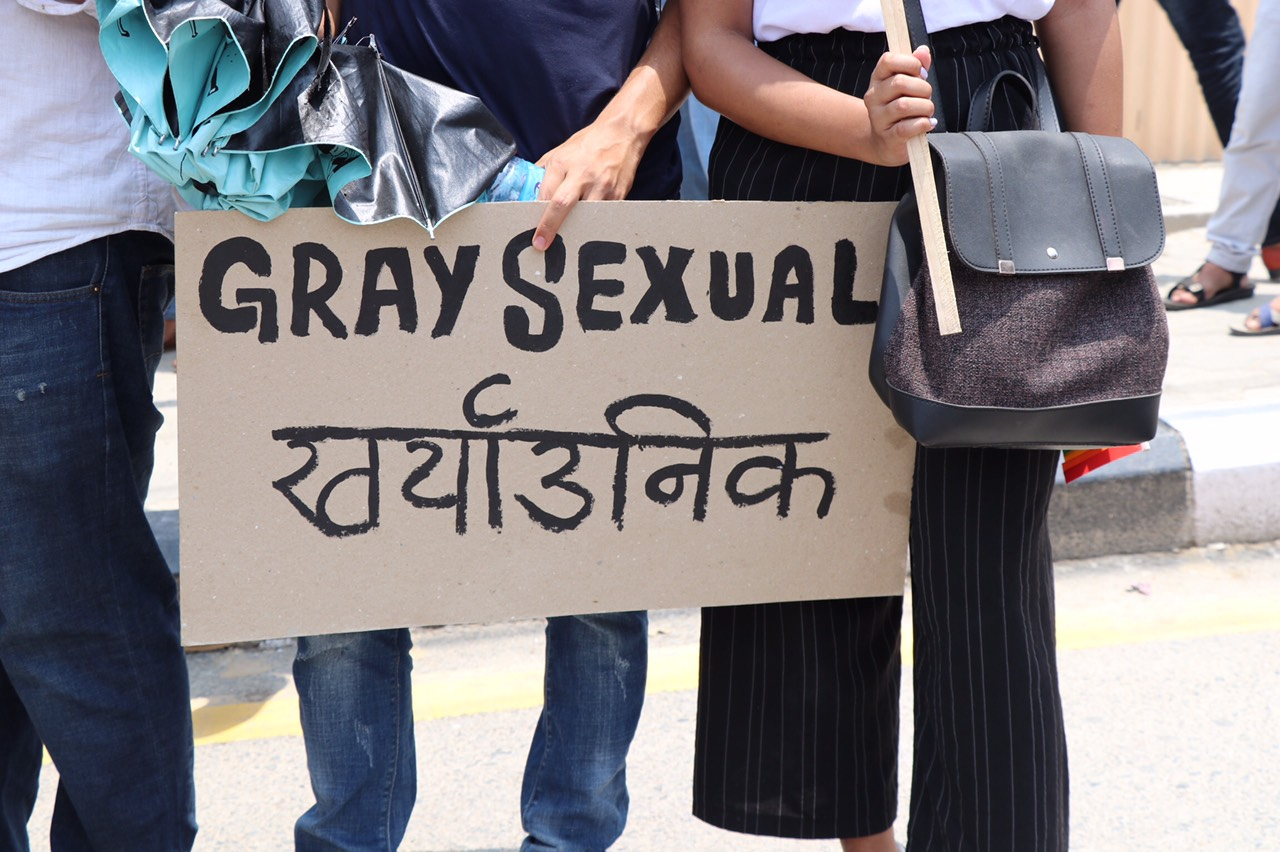

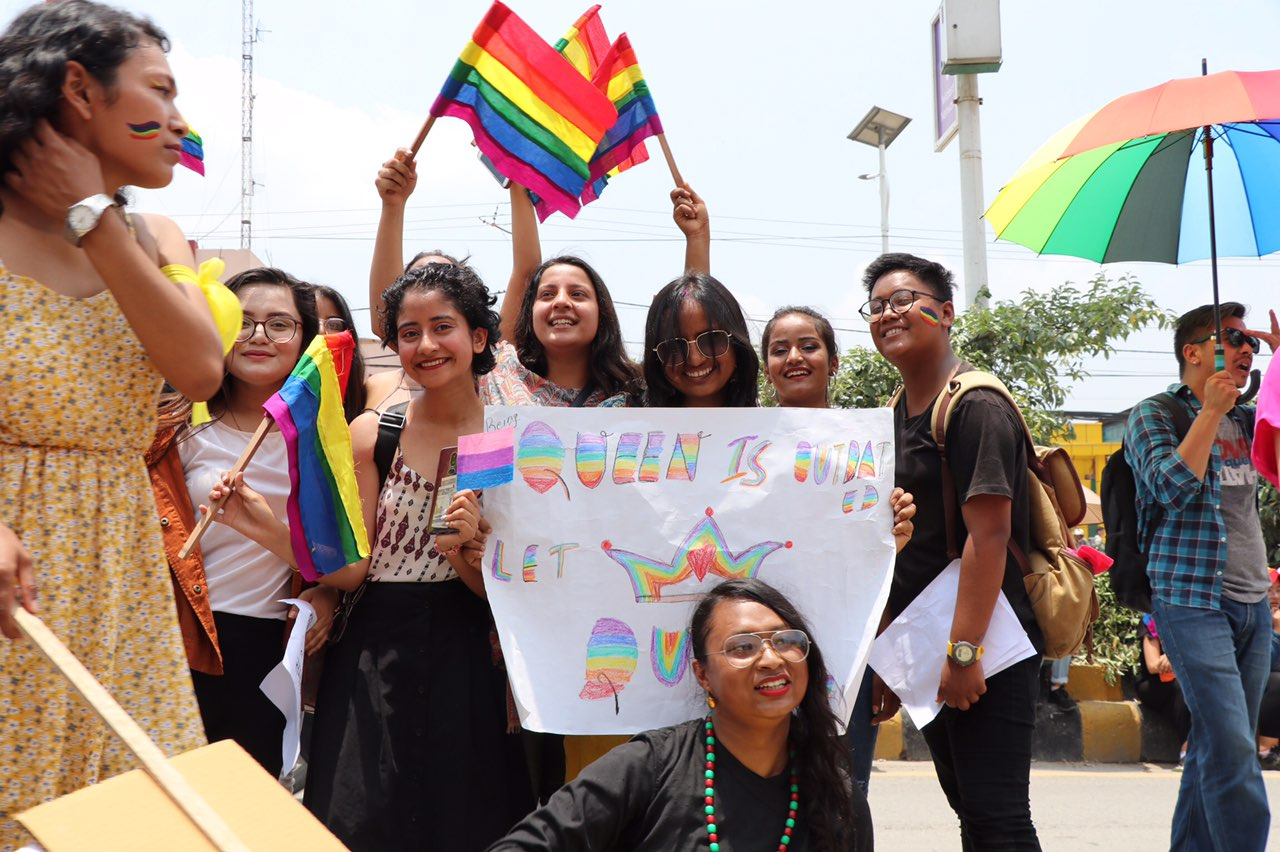

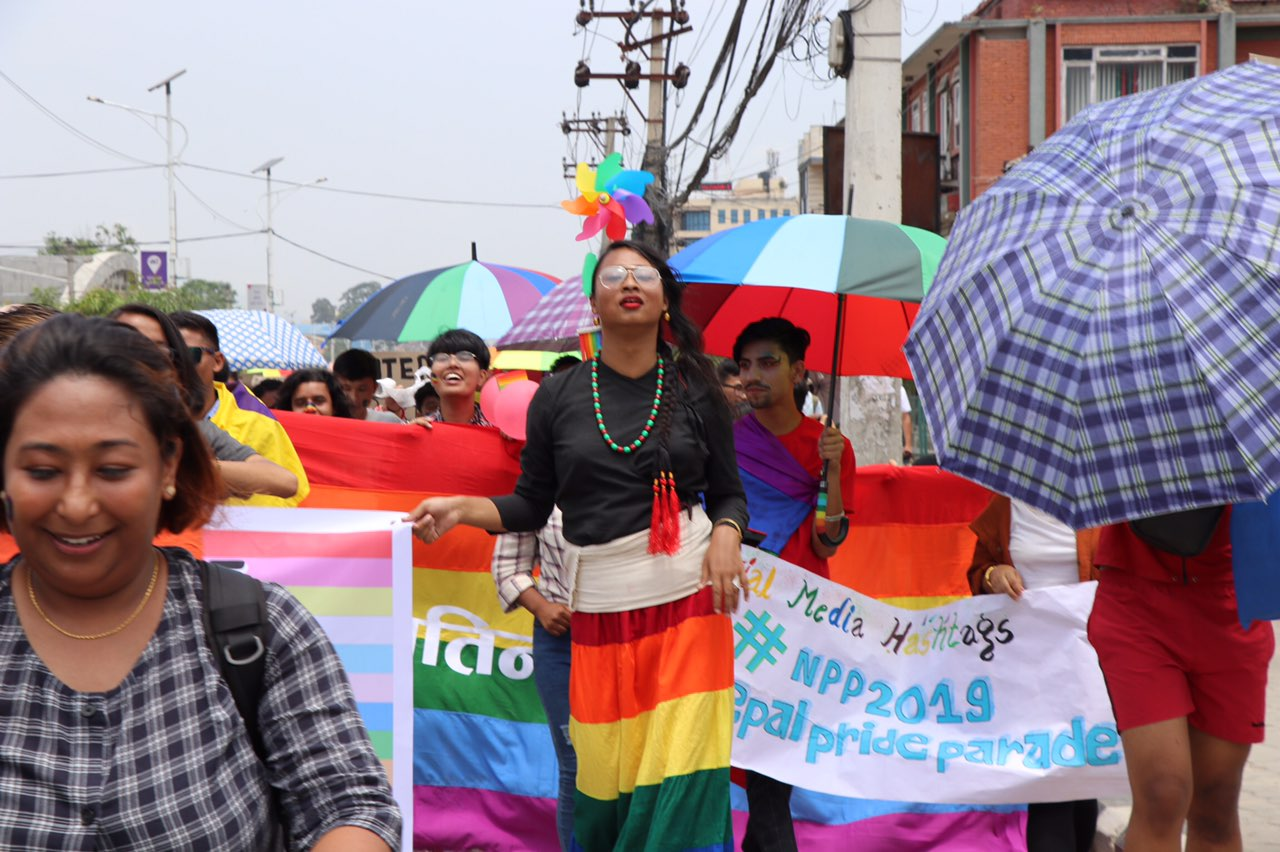

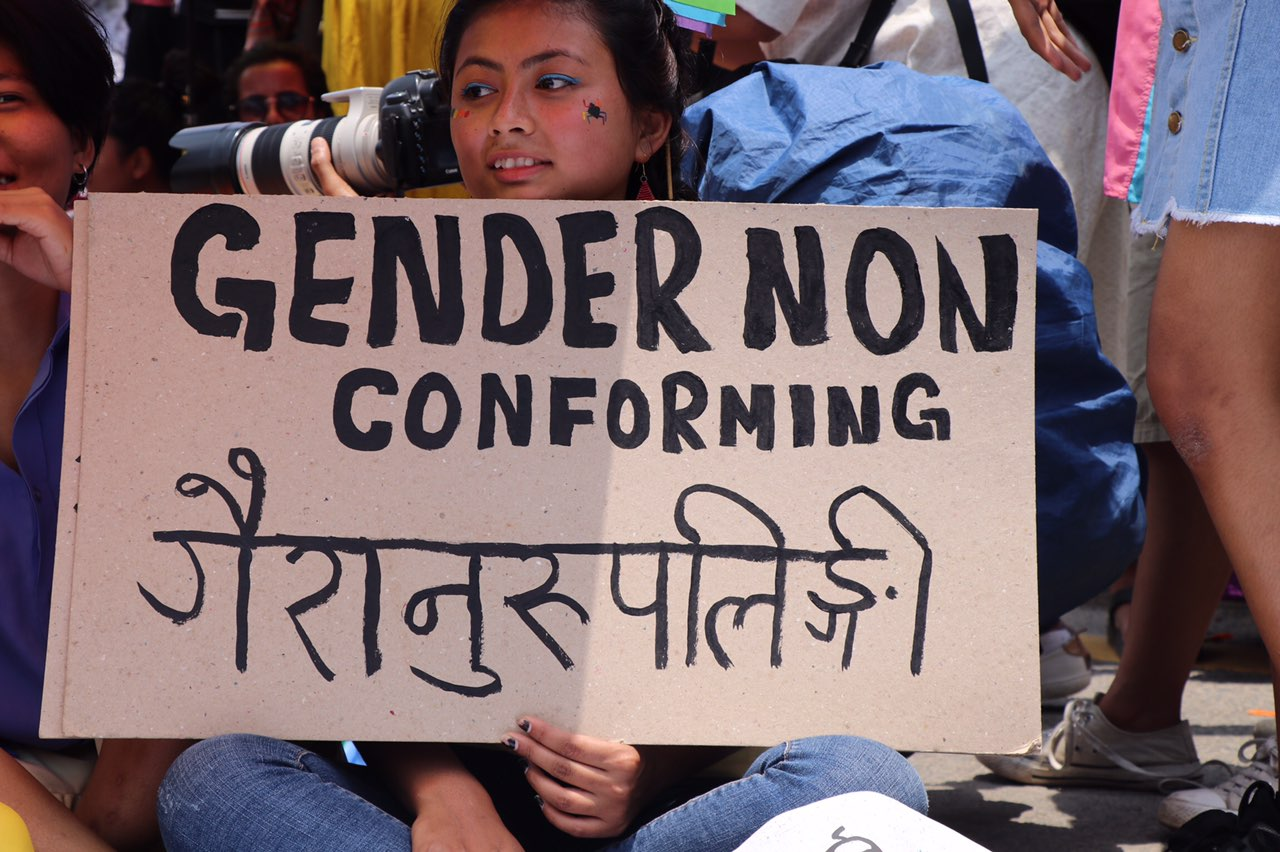

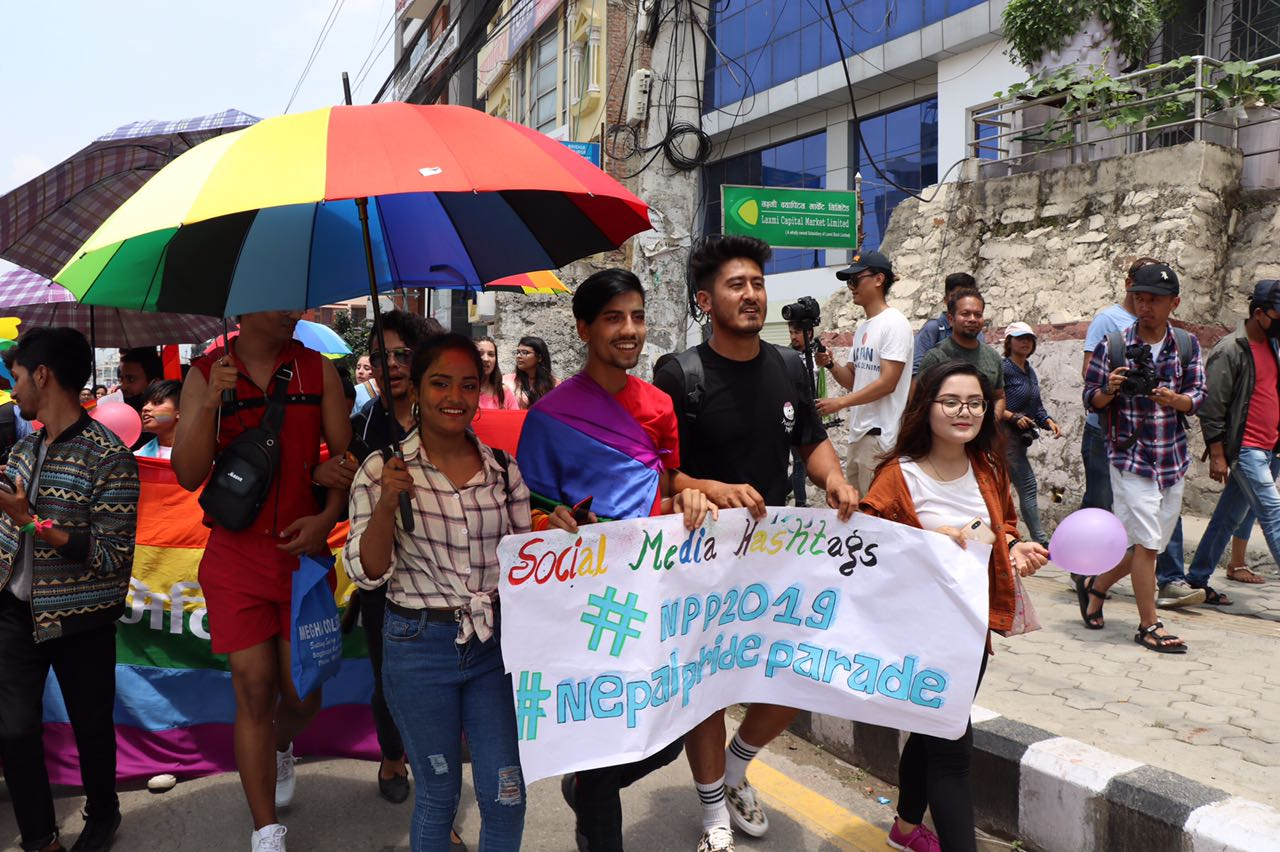

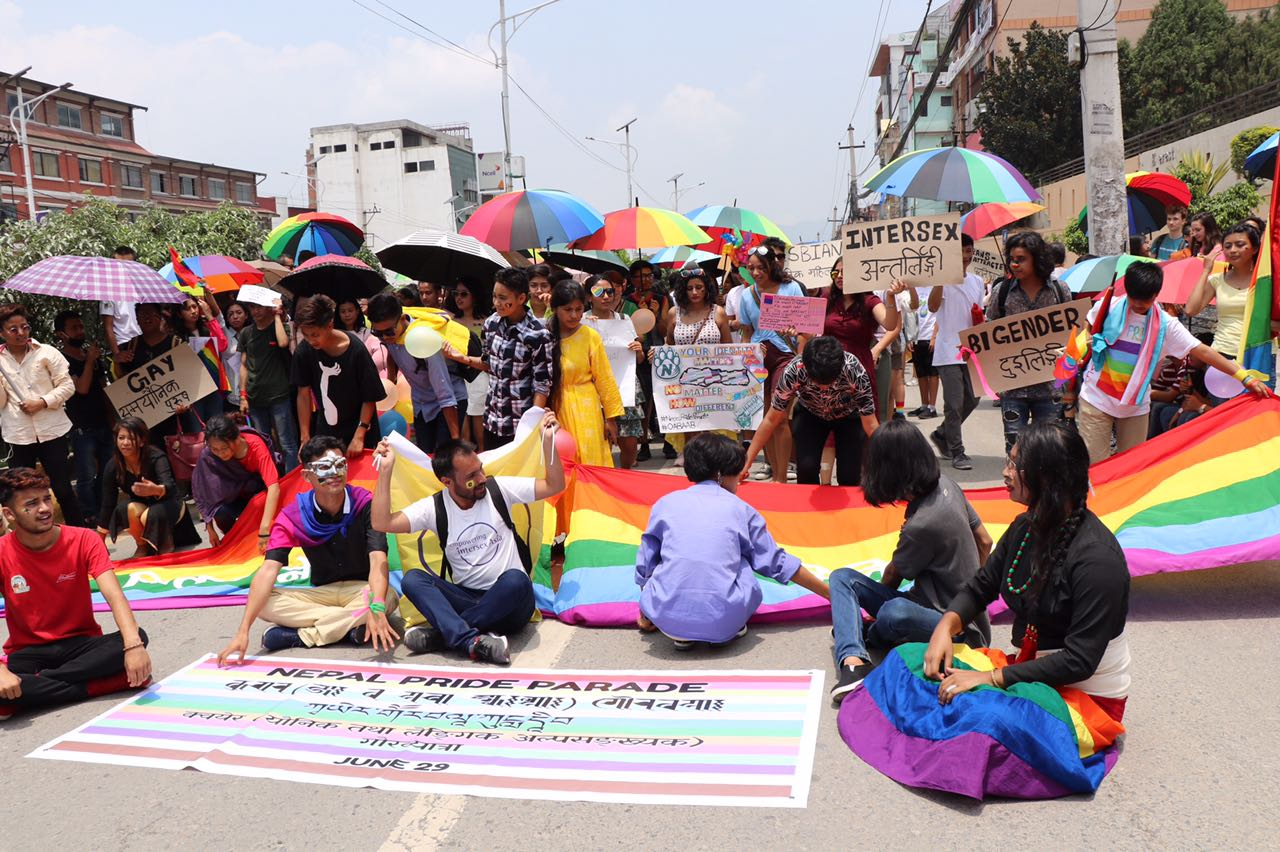

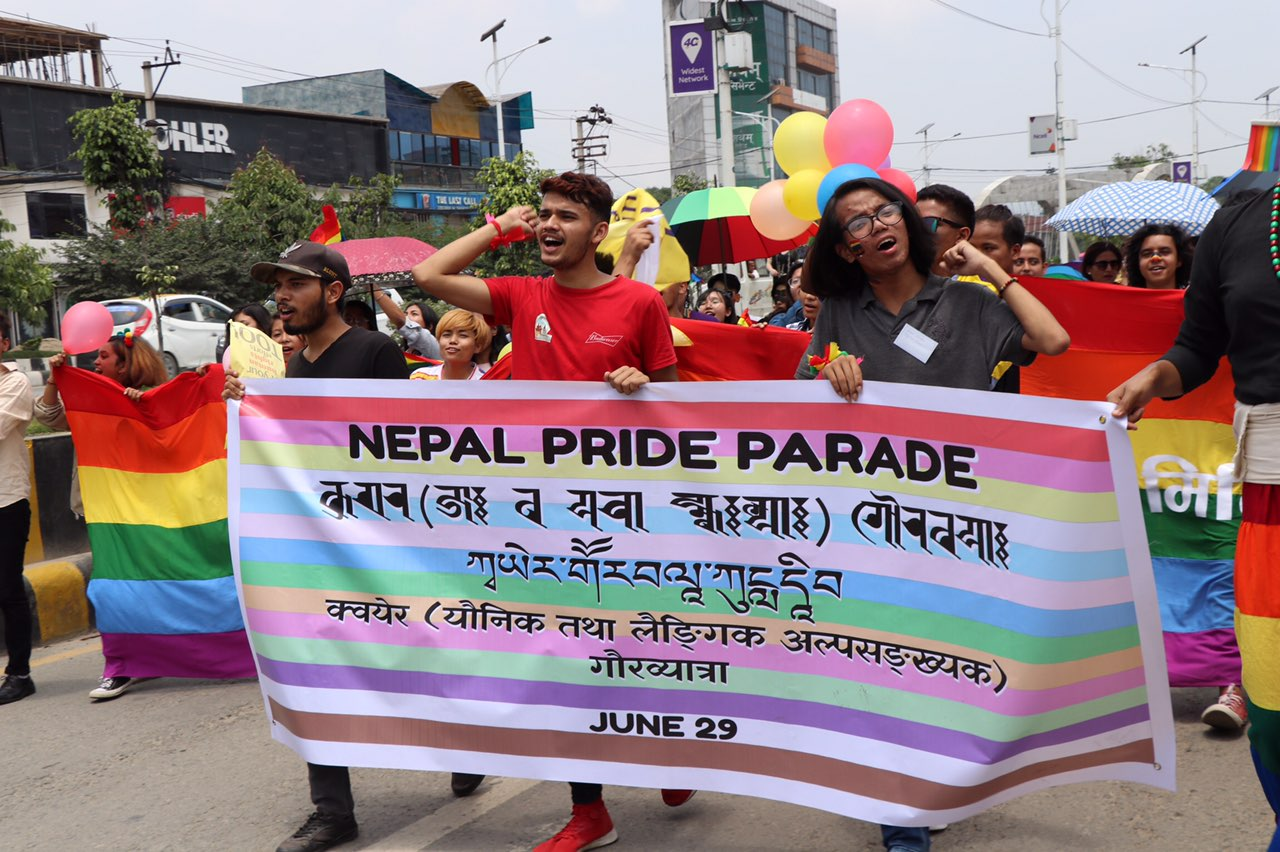

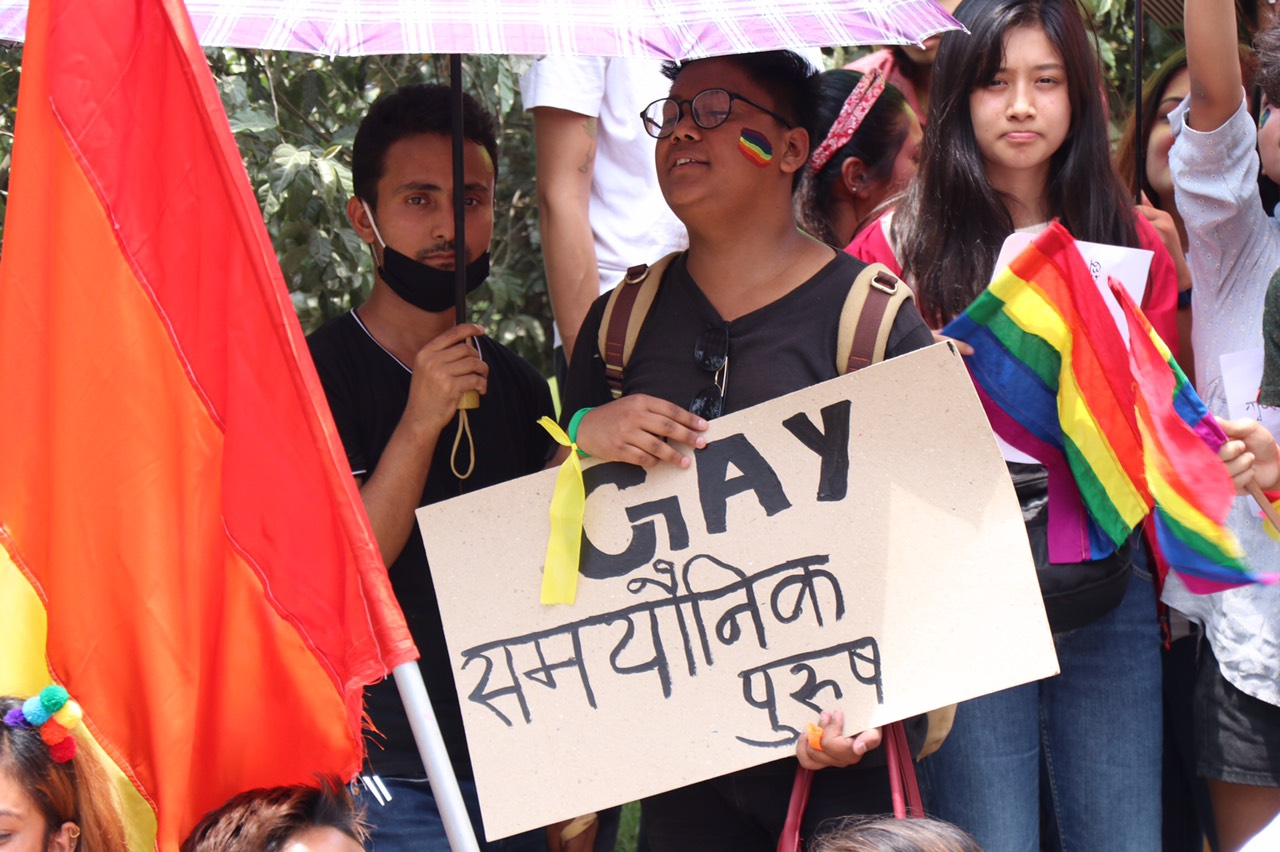

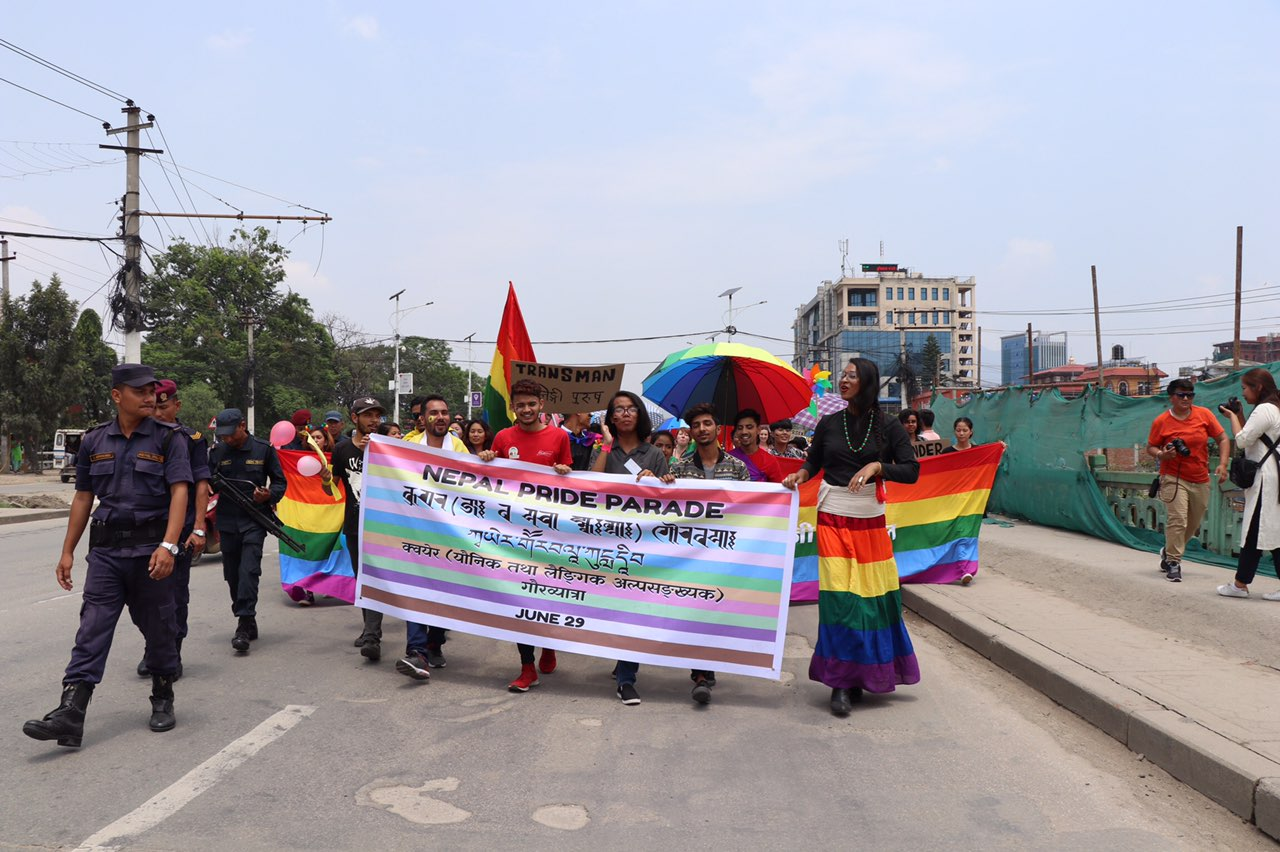

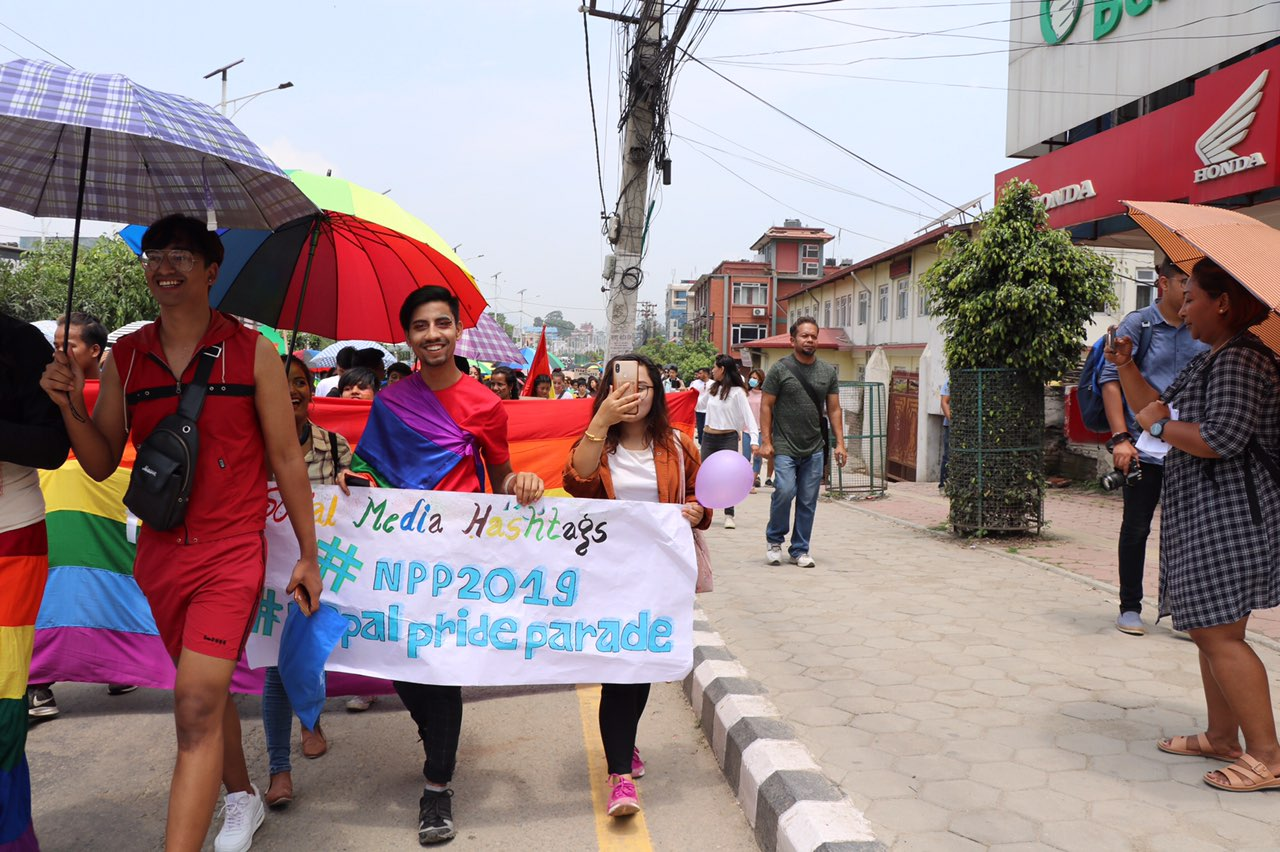

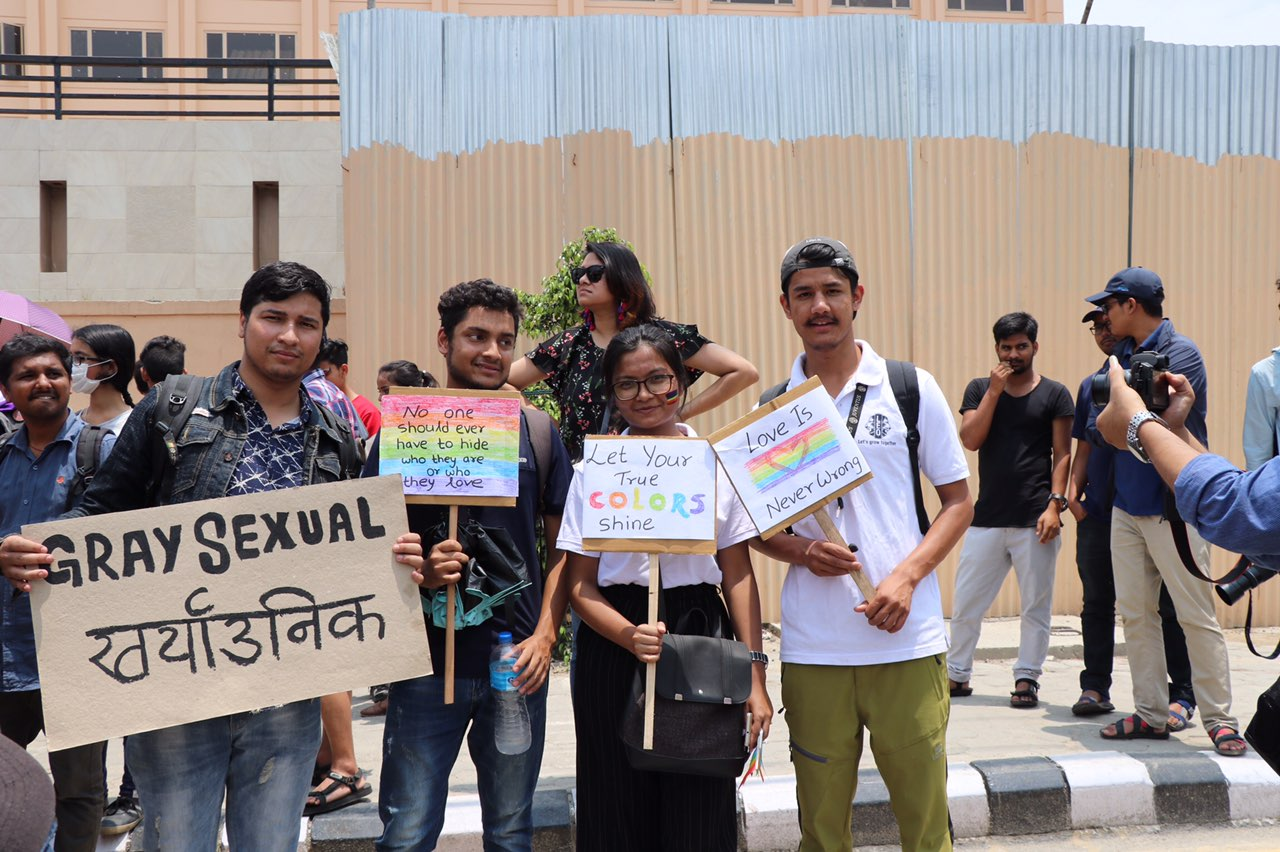

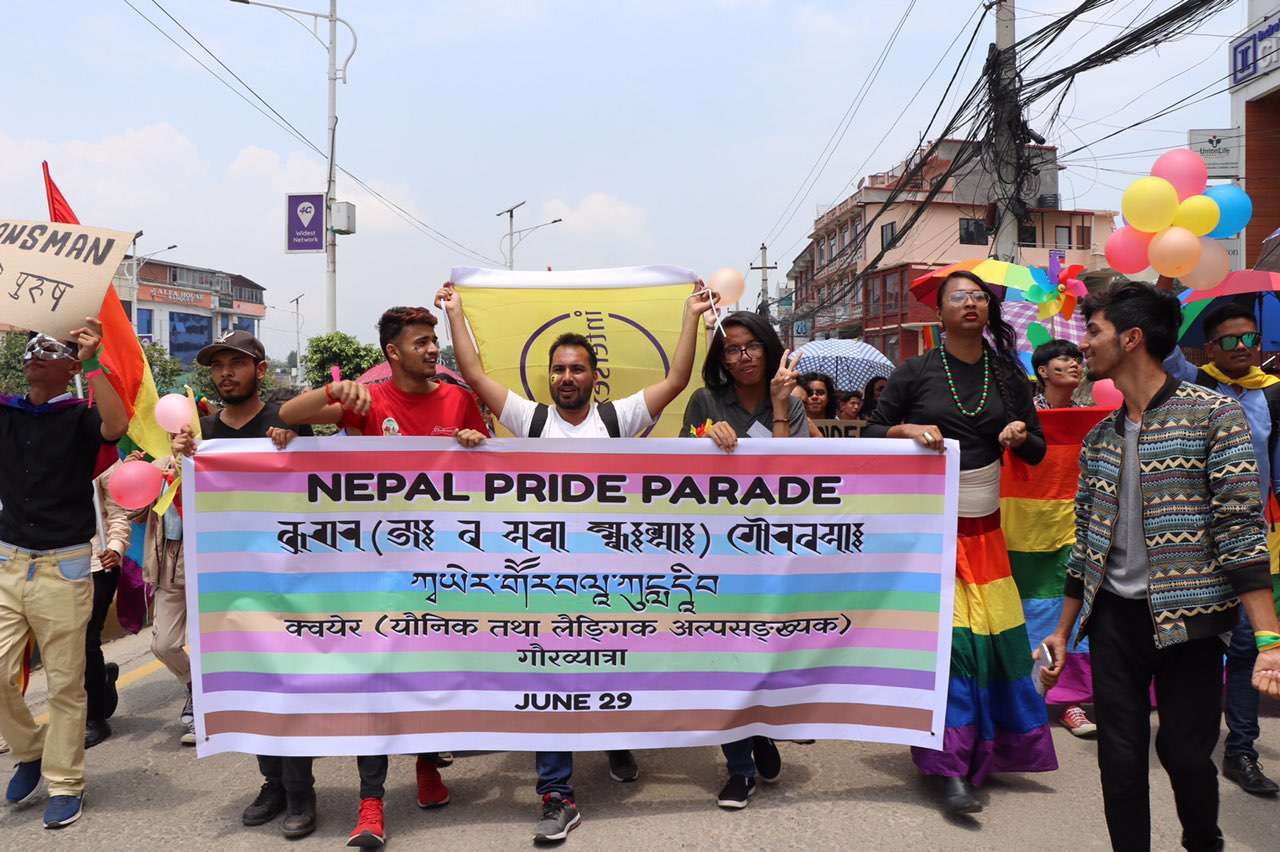

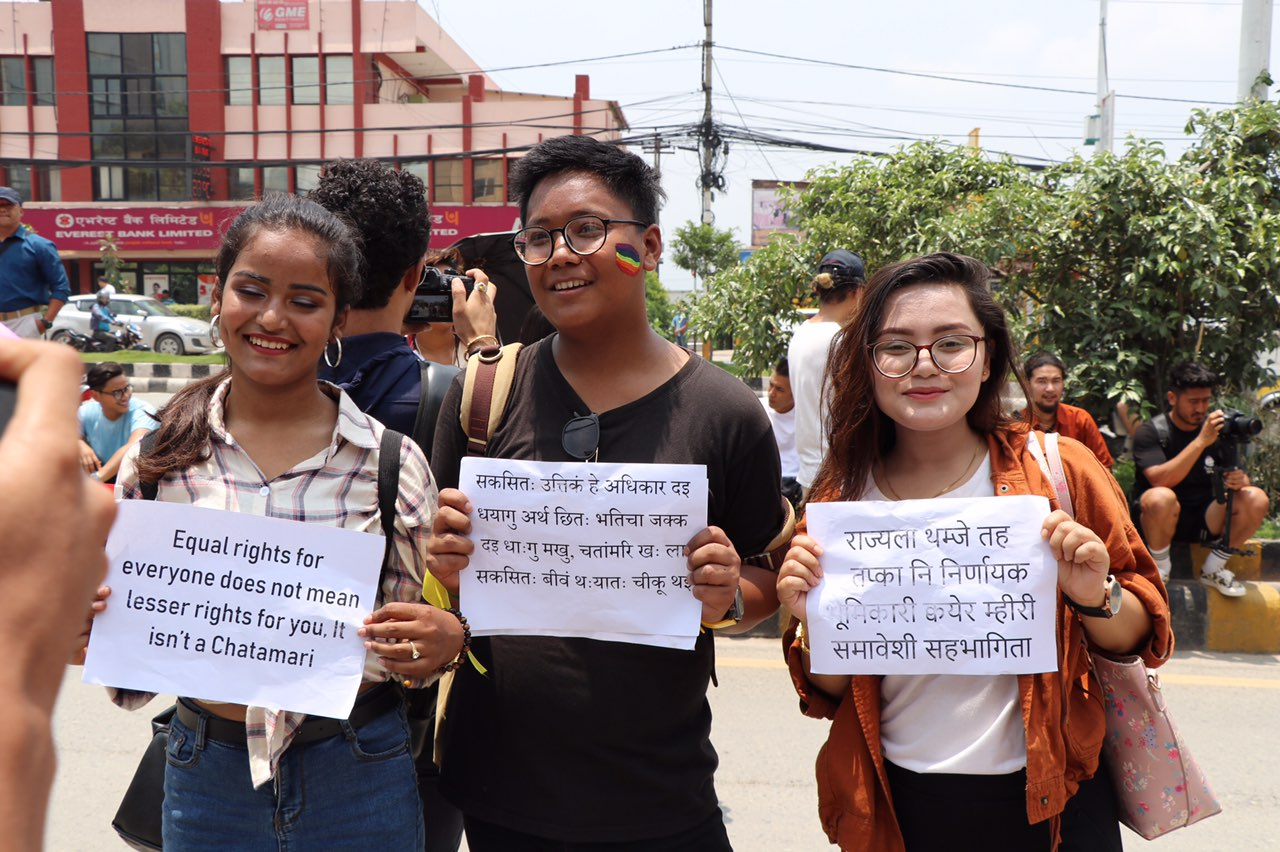

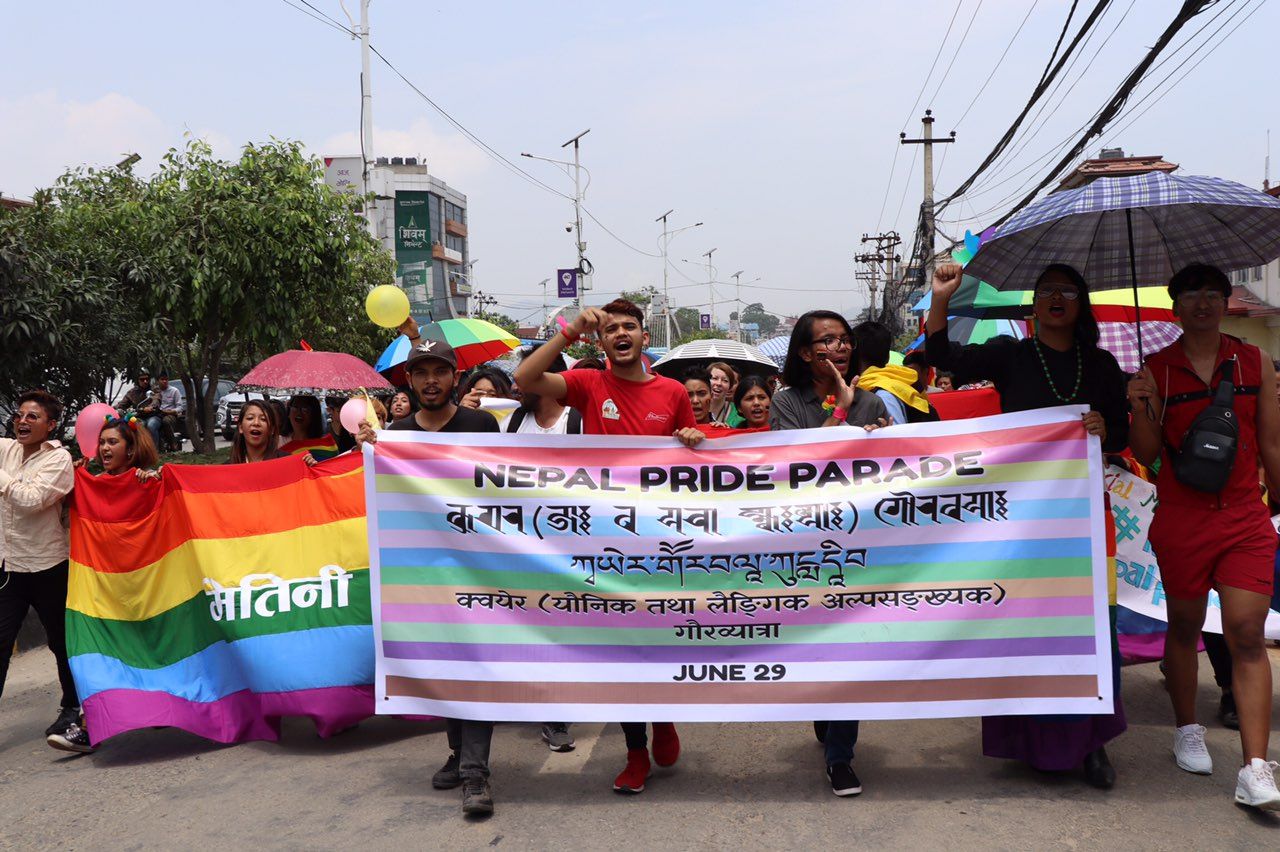

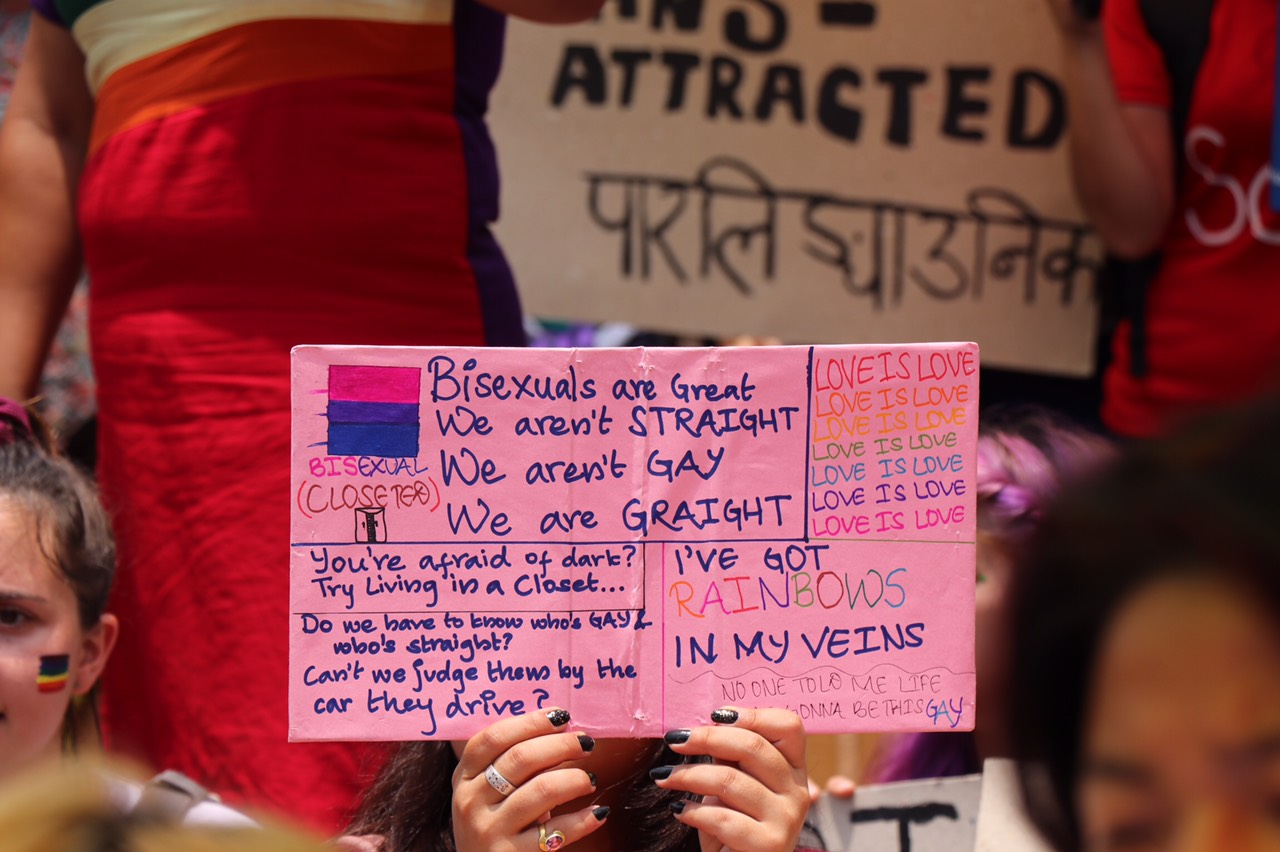

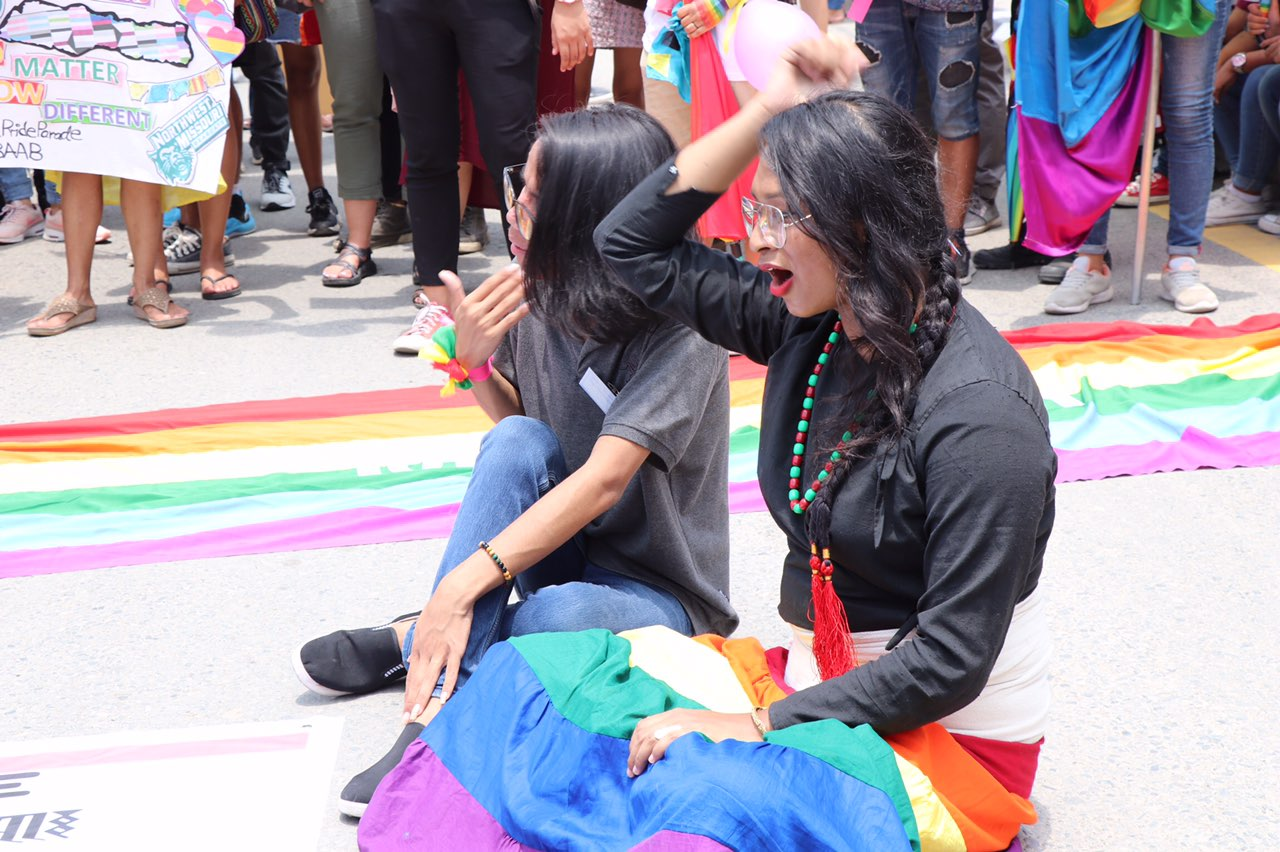

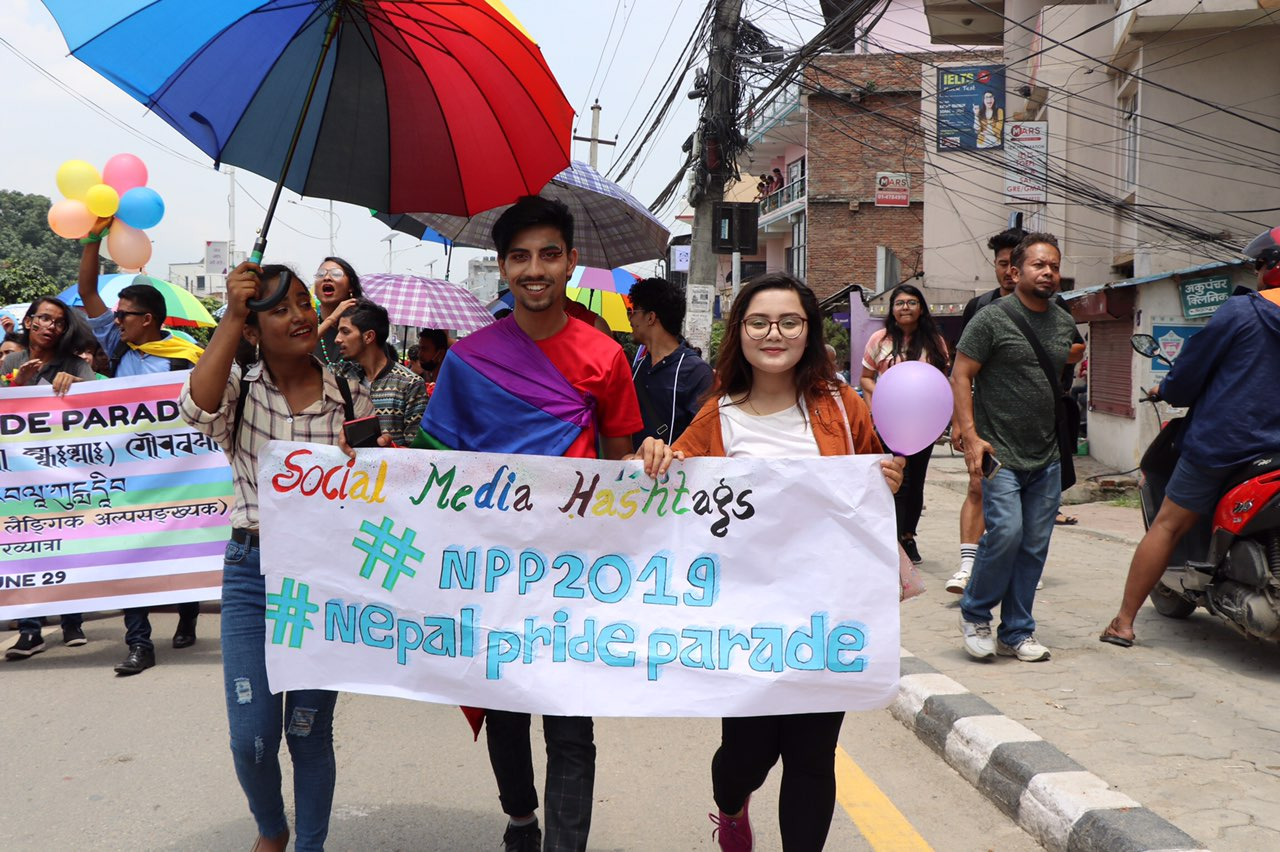

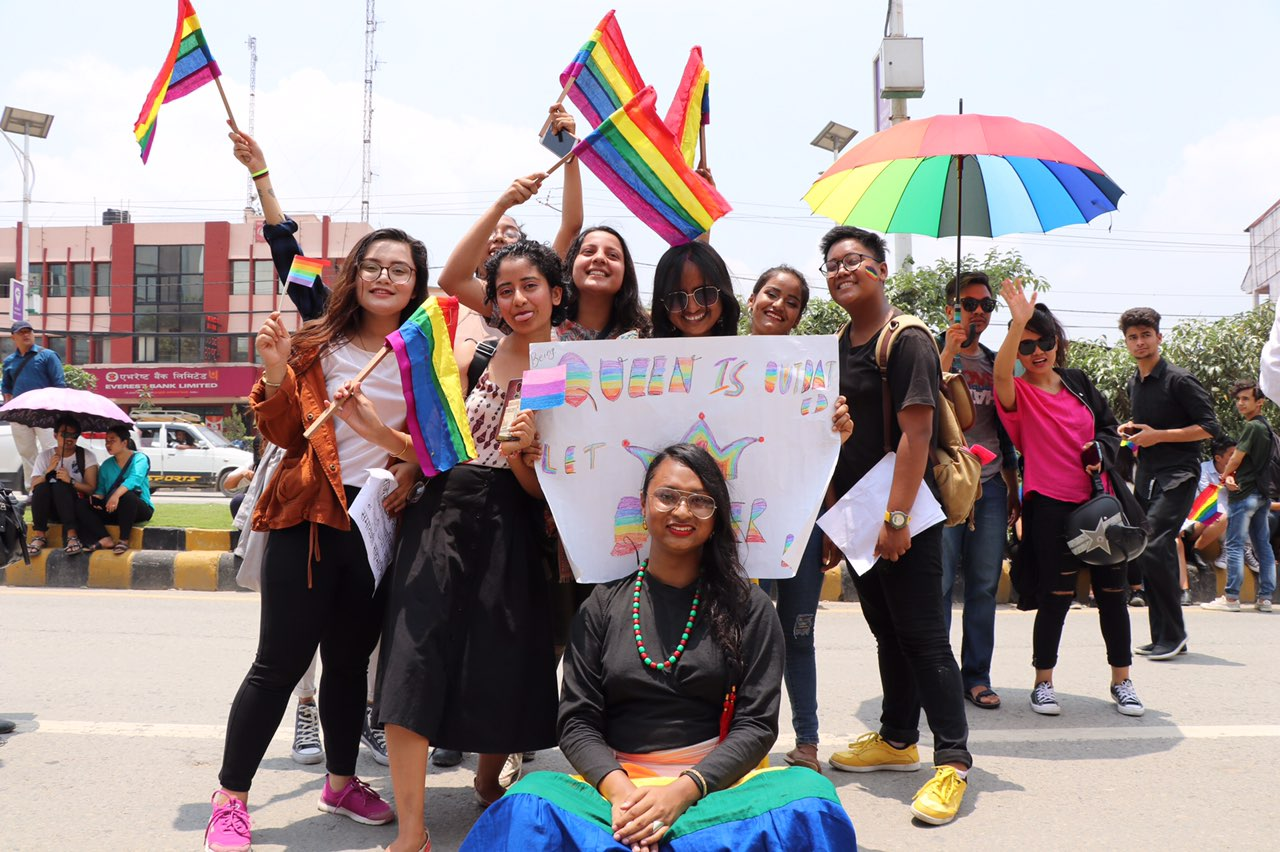

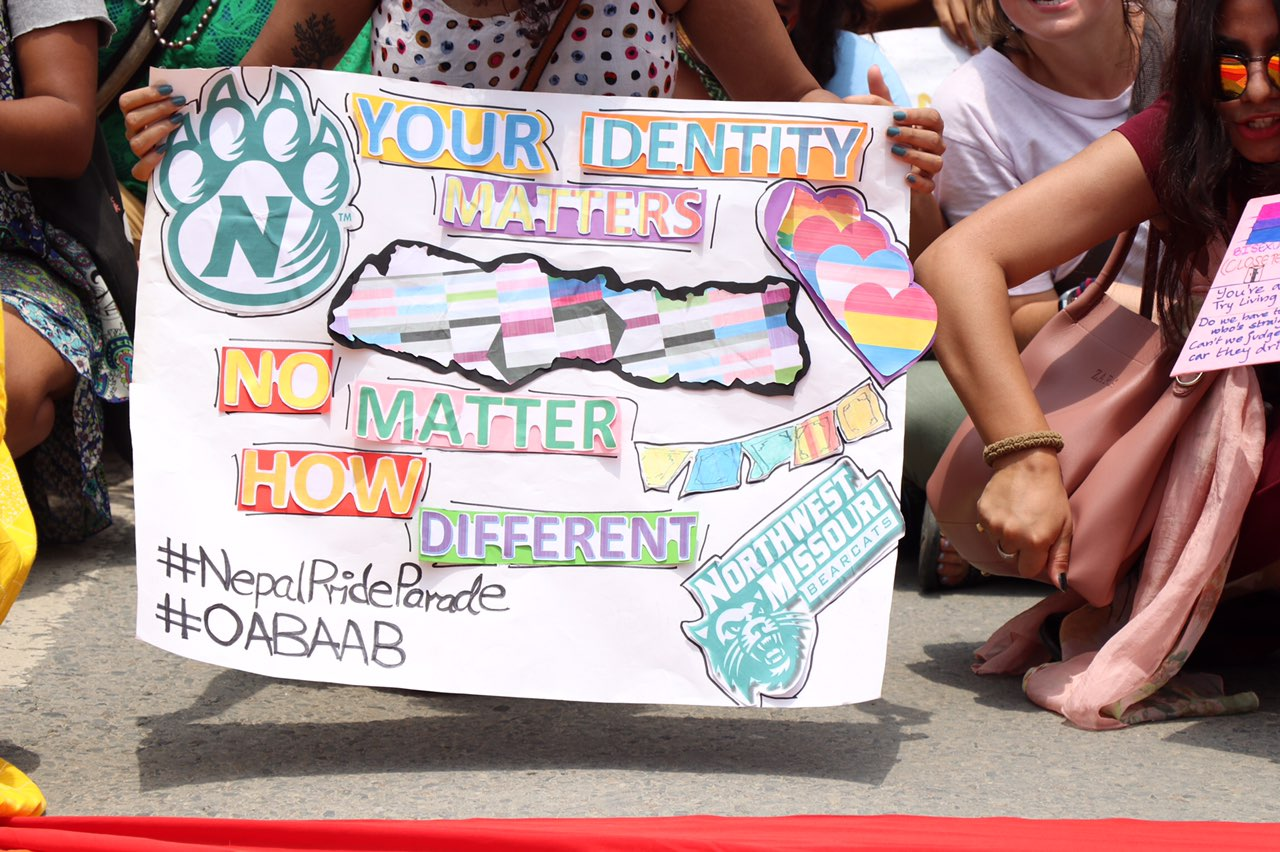

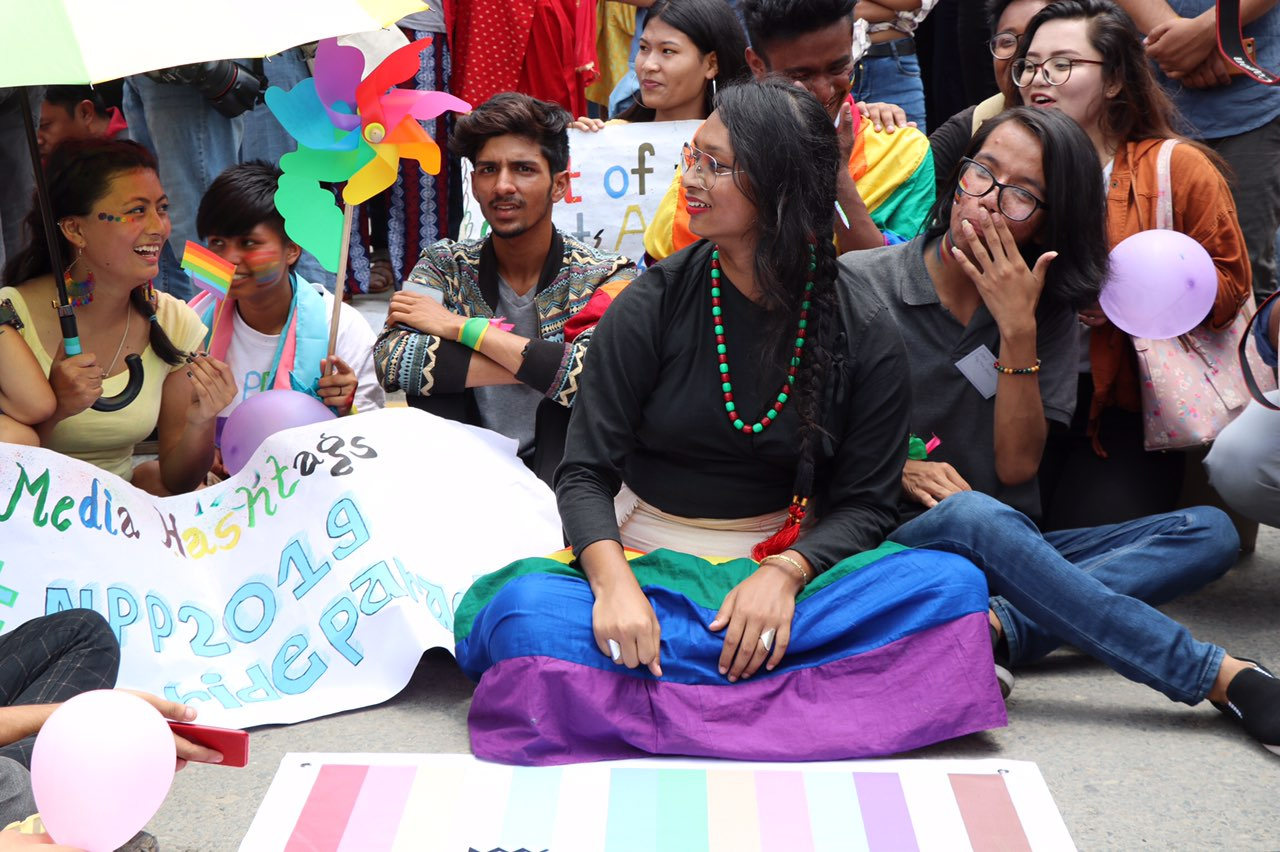

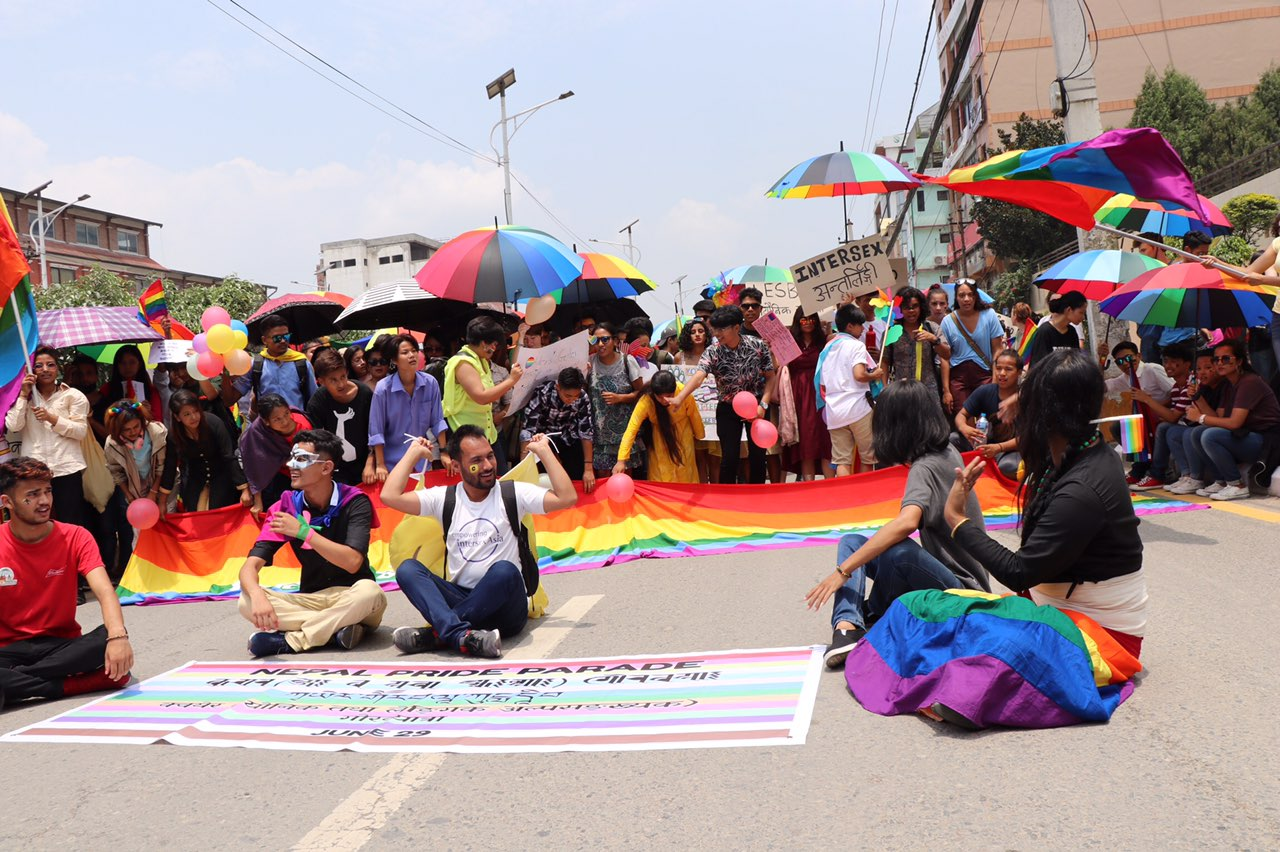

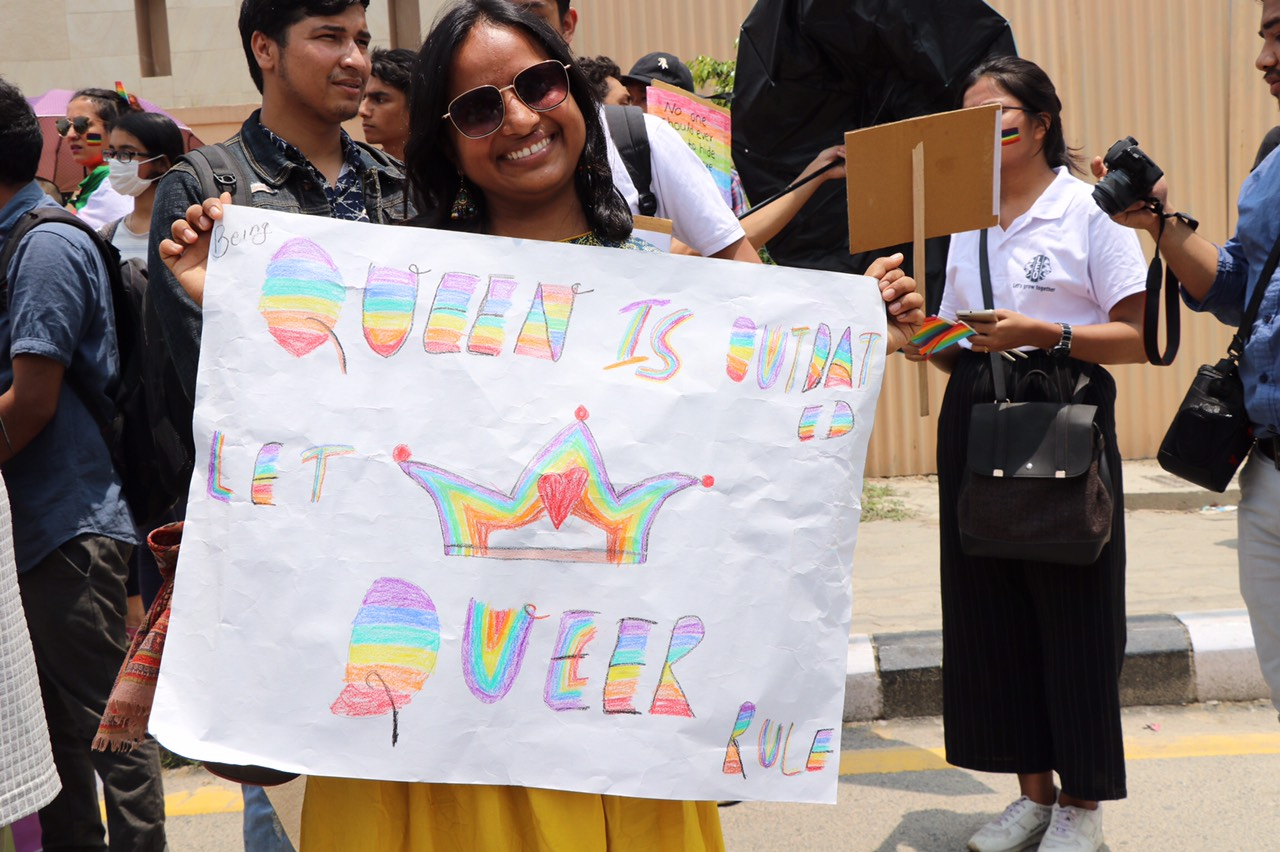

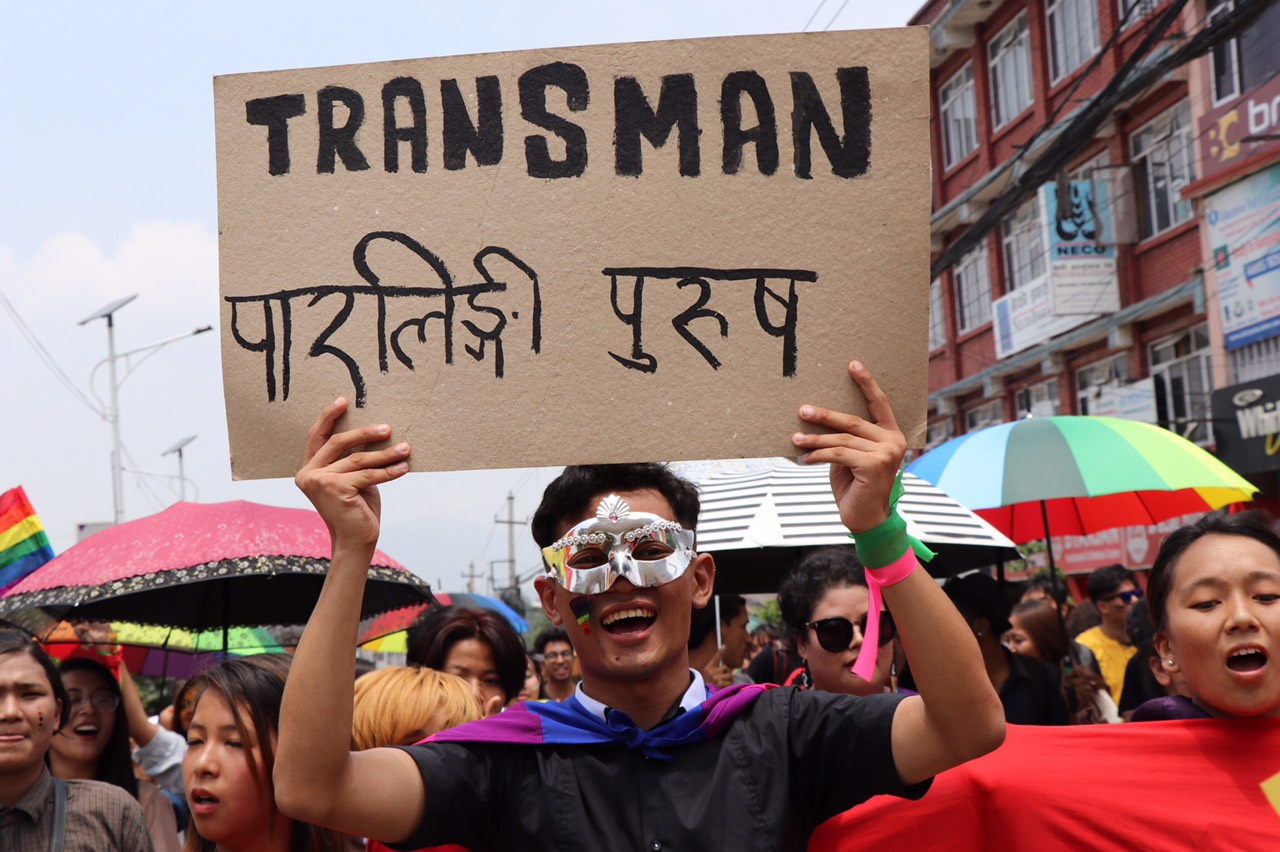

== See also ==
- LGBT rights in Nepal
- Pride parades in Nepal
