= Disorders of sex development =

Medical conditions involving the development of the reproductive system

- Other names: Disorders of sex differentiation, variations of sex characteristics
- Specialty: Medical genetics

Disorders of sex development (DSDs), also known as differences in sex development, variations in sex characteristics (VSC), sexual anomalies, or sexual abnormalities, are congenital conditions affecting the reproductive system, in which development of chromosomal, gonadal, or anatomical sex is atypical.

DSDs are subdivided into groups in which the labels generally emphasize the karyotype's role in diagnosis: 46,XX; 46,XY; sex chromosome; XX, sex reversal; ovotesticular disorder; and XY, sex reversal.

In the cases when a baby is born with an atypical anatomical sex, families often experience confusion and distress. Sexual and psychological development are influenced by numerous factors that include, but are not limited to, gender differences in brain structure, genes associated with sexual development, prenatal androgen exposure, interactions with family, and cultural and societal factors. Because of the complex and multifaceted factors involved, communication and psychosexual support are important.

A team of experts, or patient support groups, are usually recommended for cases related to sexual anomalies. This team of experts are usually derived from a variety of disciplines including pediatricians, neonatologists, pediatric urologists, pediatric general surgeons, endocrinologists, geneticists, radiologists, psychologists and social workers. These professionals are capable of providing first line (prenatal) and second line diagnostic (postnatal) tests to examine and diagnose sexual anomalies.

== Overview ==
DSDs are defined as "any problem noted at birth where the genitalia are atypical in relation to the chromosomes or gonads". There are several types of DSDs, and their effect on the external and internal reproductive organs varies greatly.

A frequently used, casual social adjective for people with DSDs is "intersex". Urologists were concerned that terms like intersex, hermaphrodite, and pseudohermaphrodite were confusing and pejorative with respect to humans. This led to the Chicago Consensus in 2005, recommending a new terminology based on the umbrella term disorders of sex development. However, intersex people have continued to prefer the term "intersex" over "DSD" by large margins. Other than disorders of sex development, another term is congenital conditions of sex development (CCSD). Since 2006, people who were previously incorrectly categorized as hermaphrodites are now labelled as having ovotesticular syndrome.

DSDs are divided into the following categories, emphasizing the karyotype's role in diagnosis:

- 46,XX DSD: Genetic Female Sex Chromosomes. Mainly virilized females as a result of congenital adrenal hyperplasia (CAH) and girls with aberrant ovarian development.
- 46,XY DSD: Genetic Male Sex Chromosomes. Individuals with abnormal testicular differentiation, defects in testosterone biosynthesis, and impaired testosterone action.
- Sex chromosome DSD: patients with sex chromosome aneuploidy or mosaic sex karyotypes. This includes patients with Turner Syndrome (45,X or 45,X0) and Klinefelter Syndrome (47,XXY) even though they do not generally present with atypical genitals.
- XX, Sex reversal: consist of two groups of patients with male phenotypes, the first with translocated Sex-determining region Y protein (SRY) and the second with no SRY gene.
- Ovotesticular syndrome: patients having both ovarian and testicular tissue. In some cases the ovarian tissue is functional.
- XY, Sex reversal: patients with female phenotypes where duplication in the Xp21.2 region of the X chromosome that contains the NR0B1 (DAX1) gene is associated with XY sex reversal.

=== Genital anatomy ===
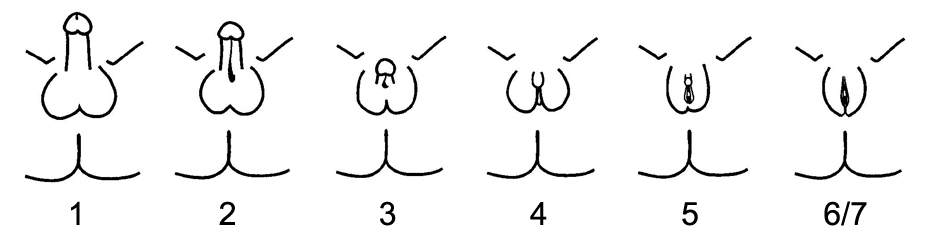
The Quigley scale is a method for describing genital development in AIS.

The penis (males) and clitoris (females) have a common origin, both arising from an embryonic structure called the primordial phallus. In typical males, the urethra is located at the tip of the penis, while in typical females the urethra is located below the base of the clitoris. It is also possible to have a urethral opening located along the shaft; this condition is known as hypospadias.

=== Management of DSDs ===
Due to the significant and life-long impacts that DSDs can have on patients and their families, it is widely accepted that children with DSDs should be managed by an experienced multidisciplinary team. Health care providers generally agree that children with DSDs should be notified early.

Appropriate and conservative medical intervention and age-appropriate child involvement in the treatment plan contribute greatly to successful outcomes for the entire range of DSDs.

== Key hormones ==
Chemical structure of testosterone

In the normal prenatal stages of fetal development, the fetus is exposed to testosterone - albeit more in male fetuses than female ones. Upon the presence of the 5α-reductase enzyme, testosterone is converted to dihydrotestosterone (i.e. DHT). If DHT is present, the male external genitalia will develop.

Development of male external genitalia:

- Genital tubercle forms the penis
- Urethral folds form the penile raphe
- Genital swellings form the scrotum

On the other hand, if maternal placenta estrogen is present without DHT, then the development of female external genitalia occurs.

Development of female external genitalia (the vulva):

- Genital tubercle forms the clitoris
- Urethral folds form the labia minora
- Genital swellings form the labia majora

Chemical structure of dihydrotestosterone (DHT)

However, in abnormal cases, sexual anomalies occur due to a variety of factors that lead to an excess of androgens in the fetus. The effects of excessive androgens differ in fetuses with XX chromosome (female) and XY chromosomes (male).

In XX chromosome fetuses, excess androgens result in ambiguous genitalia. This makes identification of external genitalia as male or female difficult. Additionally, the individual may have clitoromegaly, a shallow vagina, early and rapid growth of pubic hair in childhood, delayed puberty, hirsutism, virilisation, irregular menstrual cycle in adolescence and infertility due to anovulation.

In XY chromosome fetuses, excess androgens result in a functional and average-sized penis with extreme virilisation, but the inability for sperm production. Additionally, the individual will also experience early and rapid growth of pubic hair during childhood and precocious puberty stages.

== Causes ==
Sexual anomalies often generate from genetic abnormalities caused by many factors, leading to different sexual development. These genetic abnormalities occur during the prenatal stage of an individual's fetal development. During this stage, genetic mutations can result from endocrine disrupters in the mother's diet or environmental factors. The general causes of sexual anomalies can not be outlined due to the high variability of each individual's situations. Thus, the cause of each specific anomaly has to be studied independently.

Sexual differentiation occurs through various processes during the prenatal development period of the fetus. These processes are initiated and regulated by biological metabolites such as DNA, hormones and proteins. The initial steps of sexual differentiation begin with the development of the gonads and genitals. This process is consistent with both genders spanning over the course of the first 6 weeks following conception, during which the embryo remains pluripotent. Differentiation of the gonads begins after the 6th week, which is determined by the sex-determining region Y (SRY) gene in the Y chromosome.

The SRY gene plays an important role in developing the testes of a male individual. Following the development of the testes, hormones synthesized within the testes regulate the differentiation of both internal and external parts of the genitals. The absence of the testicles or the hormones synthesized may lead to irregular differentiation of the genitals. Genetic abnormalities or environmental factors that influence these procedures may lead to the incomplete development of the gonads and the genitals. These malformations can occur any time during the development or the birth of the embryo, manifesting as ambiguous genitals or dissonance within the genotypic and phenotypic sex of the individual, leading to a late onset of puberty, amenorrhea, a lack of or excess virilization, or later in life, infertility or early occurrence of menopause.

=== Chromosomal variation ===
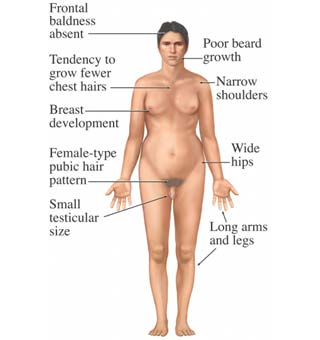
The symptoms of Klinefelter's syndrome in a human male.

DSDs caused by chromosomal variation generally do not present with genital ambiguity. This includes sex chromosome DSDs such as Klinefelter syndrome, Turner syndrome and 45,X or 46,XY gonadal dysgenesis.

Males with Klinefelter syndrome usually have a karyotype of 47,XXY as a result of having two or more X chromosomes. Affected patients generally have normal genital development, yet are infertile and have small, poor functioning testes, breast growth and delayed puberty. The incidence for 47,XXY is 1 in 500 males, but severe and rare cases of Klinefelter syndrome presents as three or more X chromosomes.

Turner syndrome is classified as aneuploidy or structural rearrangement of the X chromosome. Signs and symptoms of affected females vary among them, such as low birth weight, low-set ears, short stature, short neck and delayed puberty. The incidence is 1 in 2,500 live-born females, while most patients do not survive for more than one year after birth.

=== Gonadal development disorders ===
Gonadal development disorders form a wide spectrum, classified by their cytogenetic and histopathological features. However, unsolved diagnosis and malignancy still represent difficulties in the sex determination of these patients. Such disorders include partial or complete gonadal dysgenesis, ovotesticular DSD, testicular DSD and sex reversal.

=== Abnormal genital development ===
Genital abnormality can occur in the penis, scrotum or testes in males; and vagina and labia in females. Sometimes, ambiguous genitalia could occur, where the clear distinction of external genitalia is absent in both male and female. Hence, examination (typically at birth) is carried out where the sex of the patient will be determined through imaging and blood tests. Abnormal genital development includes disorders of fetal origin, disorders in androgen synthesis or action, disorders in anti-Müllerian hormone synthesis or action.

=== Others ===
In addition to the aforementioned sexual anomalies, there are other unclassified sexual anomalies. In males, this includes severe early-onset intrauterine growth restriction, isolated hypospadias, congenital hypogonadotropic hypogonadism, hypogonadism and cryptorchidism. In females, this includes Malformation syndromes, Müllerian agenesis/hypoplasia, uterine anomalies, vaginal atresia and labial adhesions.

== Conditions ==
- 5α-reductase deficiency (5-ARD) – an autosomal recessive condition caused by a mutation of the 5-alpha reductase type 2 gene. It only affects people with Y chromosomes, namely genetic males. People with this condition are fertile, with the ability to father children, but may be raised as females due to ambiguous or feminized genitalia.
- 17β-Hydroxysteroid dehydrogenase deficiency – a condition characterized by impaired androgen and estrogen synthesis in males and females, respectively. Results in pseudohermaphroditism/undervirilization in males.
- 46,XX/46,XY – a chimeric condition where the person shows variable karyotype in the 23rd chromosome pair, resulting from embryonic merging. It can vary in presentation from phenotypically normal, to ambiguous.
- Androgen insensitivity syndrome (AIS) – a condition which affects a genetic male's virilization. A person with androgen insensitivity syndrome produces androgens and testosterone but their body does not recognize it, either partially or completely. Mild androgen insensitivity syndrome generally causes no developmental issues and people with this form are raised as males. Partial androgen insensitivity syndrome results in ambiguous genitalia and there is no consensus regarding whether to raise a child with this form as male or female. Complete androgen insensitivity syndrome causes a genetic male to have a vagina (often incompletely developed, nearly always blind-ending), breasts, and a clitoris; people with this form are raised as females.
- Aphallia – a rare condition where a XY male is born without a penis. As of 2017, only 100 cases have been reported in literature.
- Aromatase deficiency – a disorder which, in females, is characterized by androgen excess and estrogen deficiency, and can result in inappropriate virilization, though without pseudohermaphroditism (i.e., genitals are phenotypically appropriate) (with the exception of the possible incidence of clitoromegaly). Aromatase deficiency can also be caused by mutations in P450 oxidoreductase gene.
- Aromatase excess syndrome (familial hyperestrogenism) - a condition that causes excessive estrogen production, resulting in feminization without pseudohermaphroditism (i.e., male genitalia at birth and female secondary sexual characteristics at puberty) in males and hyperfeminization in females.
- Campomelic dysplasia – a condition caused by de novo autosomal dominant mutations in the SOX9 gene, causing bowing of the limbs, sex reversal in around two thirds of 46,XY males (but not in 46,XX females), and respiratory insufficiency. While in roughly 95% of cases, death occurs in the neonatal period due to respiratory distress, those that live past infancy typically survive to become adults.
- Clitoromegaly – a clitoris that is considered larger than average. While clitoromegaly may be a symptom of an intersex condition, it may also be considered a normal variation in clitoris size. Clitoromegaly causes no health issues. Surgical reduction of the clitoris or its complete removal may be performed to normalize the appearance of the genitalia. While female genital mutilation is outlawed in many countries, reduction or the removal of the clitoris in cases of clitoromegaly are generally exempt, despite the fact that it is a nontherapeutic and sexually damaging surgery. Clitoromegaly may also be caused by females using testosterone or anabolic steroids for purposes related to female to male gender transition or bodybuilding.
- Combined 17α-hydroxylase/17,20-lyase deficiency – a condition which presents as a combination of the symptoms of congenital adrenal hyperplasia and isolated 17,20-lyase deficiency. See those two conditions for more information.
- Complete androgen insensitivity syndrome (CAIS) – a condition which completely affects a genetic male's ability to recognize androgens. It is considered a form of androgen insensitivity syndrome and is the most severe form. People with complete androgen insensitivity are raised as females and usually do not discover they are genetic males until they experience amenorrhoea in their late teens or they need medical intervention due to a hernia caused by their undescended testes. Complete androgen insensitivity syndrome results in a genetic male having a vagina, clitoris, and breasts which are capable of breastfeeding. However, they will not have ovaries or a uterus. Because they do not have ovaries or sufficiently developed testicles, people with complete androgen insensitivity syndrome are infertile.
- Congenital adrenal hyperplasia (CAH) – a condition that causes excessive androgen production, which causes excessive virilization. It is most problematic in genetic females, where severe virilization can result in fusion of the labia and an enlarged clitoris. Females with this condition are usually fertile, with the ability to become pregnant and give birth. The salt-wasting variety of this condition is fatal in infants if left untreated.
- Denys–Drash syndrome and the related Frasier syndrome – similar rare conditions arising from de novo autosomal dominant mutations in the WT1 gene, causing symptoms ranging from undervirilization to complete sex reversal with persistent Müllerian ducts in affected 46,XY males (but not in 46,XX females). The disorders are invariably fatal before the age of 15, causing kidney failure due to nephrotic syndrome.
- Estrogen insensitivity syndrome (EIS) – the estrogen counterpart to androgen insensitivity syndrome. Extremely rare, with only one verified case having been reported; a biological male presented with tall stature, a heightened risk of osteoporosis, and sterility.
- Gartner's duct cyst – persistent Wolffian Ducts in XX females.
- Gonadal dysgenesis – any congenital developmental disorder of the reproductive system characterized by a progressive loss of primordial germ cells on the developing gonads of an embryo.
- Herlyn-Werner-Wunderlich syndrome – a disorder where the Müllerian ducts fail to fuse during embryonic development, leading to the presence of 2 vaginas, 2 uteruses, and a single kidney. Can also affect the spleen, bladder and other urogenital structures.
- Isolated 17,20-lyase deficiency – a condition that is characterized by either partial or complete inability to produce androgens and estrogens. Results in partial or complete feminization and undervirilization in males and in a delayed, reduced, or absent puberty in both sexes, in turn causing sexual infantilism and infertility, among other symptoms.
- Klinefelter syndrome (47,XXY and XXY syndrome) – a condition that describes a male born with at least one extra X chromosome. Though the most common variation is 47,XXY, a man may also be 48,XXXY or 49,XXXXY. It is a common occurrence, affecting 1 in 500 to 1,000 men. About 1 in 50,000 men are affected by variant 48,XXXY (Two extra X) and 1 in 100,000 men affected by variant 49,XXXXY (Three extra X). While some men may have no issues related to the syndrome, some may experience gynecomastia, micropenis, cognitive difficulties, hypogonadism, reduced fertility/infertility, and/or little or no facial hair. Testosterone therapy may be pursued by men who desire a more masculine appearance and those with gynecomastia may opt to undergo a reduction mammoplasty. Men who wish to father children may be able to do so with the help of IVF.
- Leydig cell hypoplasia – a condition solely affecting biological males which is characterized by partial or complete inactivation of the luteinizing hormone receptor, resulting in stymied androgen production. Patients may present at birth with a fully female phenotype, ambiguous genitalia, or only mild genital defects such as micropenis and hypospadias. Upon puberty, sexual development is either impaired or fully absent.
- Lipoid congenital adrenal hyperplasia – an endocrine disorder that arises from defects in the earliest stages of steroid hormone synthesis: the transport of cholesterol into the mitochondria and the conversion of cholesterol to pregnenolone—the first step in the synthesis of all steroid hormones.
- Mild androgen insensitivity syndrome (MAIS) – a condition which mildly affects a genetic male's ability to recognize androgens. It is considered a form of androgen insensitivity syndrome and is considered the least severe form. While men generally do not need any specialized medical care related to this form, mild androgen insensitivity syndrome may result in gynecomastia and hypospadias. Neither gynecomastia nor hypospadias require surgical intervention or adversely affect a man's health though some men may opt to undergo surgery to remove their breasts and/or repair their hypospadias. Men with mild androgen insensitivity syndrome may have reduced fertility.
- Mixed gonadal dysgenesis – a condition of unusual and asymmetrical gonadal development leading to an unassigned sex differentiation. A number of differences have been reported in the karyotype, most commonly a mosaicism 45,X/ 46,XY.
- Ovotesticular disorder (also called true hermaphroditism) – a rare condition where an individual has both ovarian and testicular tissue. It is the rarest DSD with at least 500 cases being reported in literature.
- Partial androgen insensitivity syndrome (PAIS) – a condition which partially affects a genetic male's ability to recognize androgens. It is considered a form of androgen insensitivity syndrome and while it is not as severe as complete androgen insensitivity syndrome, it is more severe than mild androgen insensitivity syndrome. Partial androgen insensitivity syndrome causes major problems with gender assignment because it causes ambiguous genitalia such as a micropenis or clitoromegaly in addition to breast development. People with partial androgen insensitivity syndrome who are assigned as males may undergo testosterone therapy to virilize their body while those who are assigned as females may undergo a surgical reduction of the clitoris and/ or estrogen therapy.
- Penoscrotal transposition (PST) – a group of congenital defects involving an abnormal spatial arrangement of penis and scrotum.
- Persistent Müllerian duct syndrome – a condition where fallopian tubes, uterus, or the upper part of the vagina are present in an otherwise normal male.
- Pseudovaginal perineoscrotal hypospadias (PPSH) – a form of ambiguous genitalia which results in a phallic structure that is smaller than a penis but larger than a clitoris, a chordee, hypospadias, and a shallow vagina.
- Swyer syndrome (Pure Gonadal Dysgenesis or XY gonadal dysgenesis) – a type of hypogonadism in a person whose karyotype is 46,XY. The person is externally female with streak gonads, and left untreated, will not experience puberty. Such gonads are typically surgically removed (as they have a significant risk of developing tumors) and a typical medical treatment would include hormone replacement therapy with female hormones.
- Turner syndrome (Ullrich-Turner syndrome and gonadal dysgenesis) – a condition that describes a female born with only one X chromosome or with an abnormal X chromosome, making her karyotype 45,X0. It occurs in 1 in 2,000 to 5,000 females. Turner syndrome can cause numerous health and development problems, including but not limited to short stature, lymphedema, infertility, webbed neck, coarctation of the aorta, ADHD, amenorrhoea, and obesity.
- Müllerian agenesis (Mayer-Rokitansky-Küster-Hauser syndrome or vaginal agenesis) – a condition that causes the uterus and other reproductive organs in a 46,XX female to be small or absent, as well as the vaginal canal itself. It affects 1 out of 4,500 to 5,000 females and can also come with skeletal or endocrine system issues at conception.
- XX testicular DSD – a condition where an individual with an XX karyotype has a male appearance. Genitalia can range from normal to ambiguous genitalia. It is estimated to occur in 1 in 20,000 males.

== Diagnosis and symptoms ==
=== First line diagnostic tests (prenatal) ===
Human male karyotype

==== Family history ====
- Symptoms such as infertility, early menopause, amenorrhea or sudden infant death syndrome (SIDS) could be a sign. Hence, an early check-up should be conducted.

==== Analysis of karyotype ====
- Peripheral blood is collected for karyotyping. This helps classify the patient in one of the three main categories of DSD: chromosomal variation, gonadal development disorders and abnormal genital development.

==== Abdominal ultrasounds ====
- The presence of gonads, uterus and vagina should be monitored. This can be done through abdominal ultrasounds. However, the absence of these sex organs will lead to difficulties in gender identification.

=== Second line diagnostic tests (postnatal) ===
==== Physical examination ====
1. Inspection of the genitalia with care and palpation must be conducted with the following points in mind.
  - Determining the degree of virilization or masculinisation:
    - In a female fetus, the Prader scale should be used to assess the extent of the virilisation if the karyotyping results are not out yet.
    - In males, the external masculinization score should be used.
2. Palpation of gonads from the labioscrotal fold to the abdomen (inguinal canal).
3. Hydration and blood pressure assessment should be conducted.
4. Additional dysmorphic features should be ruled out because genitalia malformations would occur if the patient has multiple malformation syndromes.

==== Evaluation of hormones 48 hours after birth ====
- 17-Hydroxyprogesterone can be used to screen for congenital adrenal hyperplasia (CAH). This is commonly found in patients with 46, XX DSD.
- Dehydroepiandrosterone (DHEA) in addition to progesterone allows for the diagnosis of more uncommon forms of CAH and other inherited disorders.
- Base testosterone, follicle stimulating hormone (FSH) and luteinising hormone (LH) levels are precursors in individuals with 46,XX DSD. These tests are conducted within the timeframe of thirty hours post-birth to anywhere between fifteen and ninety days post-birth. This data collected within time frame can be used to gauge the growth of the fetus when it reaches six months of age.
- Basal cortisol levels and adrenocorticotropic hormone (ACTH) is essential in diagnosing panhypopituitarism and enzymatic disorders affecting adrenal steroidogenesis.
- The anti-Müllerian hormone is used for evaluating the function of Sertoli cells.
- A urinary steroid profile shows the ratio of precursor metabolites within measured urine concentrations and the resultant products produced indicates the enzyme is the cause of a sexual defect. This is a more specific procedure in the detection of the defect in comparison to analysing blood.

== Treatment and management ==
The treatment and/or management of DSDs with atypical genitalia will vary from person to person. This may include gender affirmation surgery, medical treatment and surgical treatment.

=== Gender affirmation surgery ===
Gender affirmation plays a critical role in the management of sexual anomaly cases. Ultimately, the parents and a multidisciplinary team are responsible for assigning the sex that is affirmative the gender of the concerned person. The current guidelines of gender affirmation include the psychosocial effects in adults with etiological diagnosis, the potential for fertility, surgical opportunities and hormone replacement therapy in the course of puberty.

There are other factors considered during this process. This may include cultural and religious factors as well as the implications it has on the individual in later life. It is regulated by reference centers with groups specialised in managing cases of sexual anomalies.

=== Medical treatment ===
Hormonal treatment is an accepted and standardised approach to treat different congenital sexual anomalies. Patients that are deficient in hormones produced by the adrenal glands require immediate medical attention. They are given a hormone called hydrocortisone, a form of hormone replacement therapy, with the objective to induce puberty.

Utilizing sex steroids as hormonal therapy is deemed controversial with concerns of its duration of initiation, dosage and regimen. However, it is agreed amongst most clinicians that low doses of hormonal treatment should begin around the age of 11 to 12 years old and should be increased progressively.

=== Surgical treatment ===
Surgical procedures are an alternative to hormonal treatment available for patients to address genital anomalies and improve the body's sexual functions. However, a common dilemma in these procedures is that they are often derived from the patient's expectation of 'normal' genitals from an aesthetic and functional standpoint. Oftentimes, this leads to extensive surgical interventions.

In most cases, surgical procedures result in permanent changes to the appearance and function of the patient's body. Therefore, the decision to proceed with this arrangement must be a joint agreement between the family and the multidisciplinary team. The most ideal situation would be to include the patient as part of the decision-making process. However, cases where surgical treatments were performed at an early age are recognised as mutilation of the body. Subsequently, it has become increasingly common to defer surgical treatments until the patient is of appropriate age to be involved in the decision-making process.

== Organizations ==
=== Clinical networks and organizations ===
==== DSD-TRN ====
The Differences of Sex Development-Translational Research Network (DSD-TRN) is based in the United States and aims to improve DSD care across the United States.

==== I-DSD ====
The International-Differences of Sex Development (I-DSD) is a research organization in Europe. This organization connects medical and research centers internationally in an effort to improve clinical practice, research, and general understanding of differences of sex development. I-DSD regularly hosts a symposium to provide updates on current care in DSD internationally, facilitate networking for those in DSD Care, and promote high quality DSD research.

=== Patient support and advocacy organizations ===
Notable patient support and advocacy organizations include:

=== Africa ===
- Intersex South Africa
- Support Initiative for People with Congenital Disorders

=== Asia ===
- Intersex Asia
- Oii-Chinese
- OII Russia
- Srishti Madurai (India)

=== Europe ===
- Association of the Russian-Speaking Intersex
- Collectif intersexe activiste (CIA-OII France)
- InterAction Suisse (Switzerland)
- Internationale Vereinigung Intergeschlechtlicher Menschen (OII Germany)
- Intersex Russia
- Intersex UK
- OII Europe
- Organisation Internationale des Intersexes - Francophonie (OII French-speaking)
- OII UK
- Zwischengeschlecht (Switzerland/Germany)
- Caminar intersex (España -islas Canarias)
- İnter Dayanışma (Inter Solidarity Turkey)

=== Latin America ===
- Brújula Intersexual (Intersex Compass) (Mexico and Latin America)

=== North America ===
- Accord Alliance (USA)
- Brújula Intersexual (Intersex Compass)
- interACT, formerly known as Advocates for Informed Choice (USA)
- Intersex Campaign for Equality (IC4E), formerly OII-USA
- Intersex Society of North America (ISNA) (defunct)
- Organisation Internationale des Intersexes - Francophonie (Canada)

=== Oceania ===
- Intersex Human Rights Australia, formerly OII Australia
- Intersex Peer Support Australia (also known as AISSGA, Androgen Insensitivity Syndrome Support Group Australia)
- Intersex Trust Aotearoa New Zealand, also known as Intersex Awareness New Zealand

=== International ===
- GATE
- International Lesbian, Gay, Bisexual, Trans and Intersex Association (ILGA)
- Organisation Intersex International (OII)

== Controversy ==
Even though the term disorder of sex development (DSD) is widely accepted by the medical community, its suitability and adequacy to represent these individuals are criticised by many support and advocacy groups. Firstly, the word 'disorder' carries negative connotations. Secondly, with current nomenclature, DSD is an overly generalised term for conditions that do not have differences in genital appearance or gender identity (e.g. Klinefelter syndrome and Turner syndrome). Thirdly, the term 'DSD' lacks specificity and clarity; and therefore unhelpful in the diagnosis process. Hence, many support groups and advocates believe that the medical community should discontinue the use of 'DSD' as a designation tool.

Furthermore, people who live with conditions regarding sexual abnormalities may encounter various mental and physical health problems. This may include traumatic experience with their own bodies, dissatisfaction with body image, low-self esteem, anxiety, depression, bipolar disorders, eating disorders, personality disorders, schizophrenia disorders, trauma and stress-related disorders, etc.

Many intersex people are engaged in activism to stop hormonal treatments, citing the extreme and harmful nature of many of the treatments, further arguing that many of the treatments serve no medical purpose.

=== Terminology ===
The term disorders of sex development has generally been accepted by the medical community, as well as being a popular term in academic literature. However, the term is not universal among patients or support groups. One study stated that it can affect individuals covered by the description in a negative way, and that the terminology might impact choice and utilization of health care providers. Another study found that most affected individuals did not find the term offensive. The ICD-11, which is the World Health Organization's international guide to medical coding (effective as of January 1, 2022), references DSDs as intersex traits or conditions, as do some medical journals. The Council of Europe and Inter-American Commission on Human Rights have called for a review of medical classifications that unnecessarily medicalize intersex traits.

The DSD as a model was advocated for by intersex advocates to include all variation of atypical sexual development. Specifically the DSD exists as replacement for the "optimum gender rearing model," which was the standard model for individuals with atypical sexual development. This model stated goal was to assign a gender binary, usually female via non-consensual medicalization, often via the falsification of medical records. After the publication of individuals who had undergone the OGR model and had gone through serious physiological distress, (such as David Reimer), the model was discredited. The term "disorders of sexual development" was chosen to reflect the variation of sexual development over differences which effects all individuals, this however has been controversial, with many instead opting for "differentiation" or "variation."

Sociological research in Australia on 272 "people born with atypical sex characteristics," published in 2016, found that 3% of respondents used the term "disorders of sex development" or "DSD" to define their sex characteristics, while 21% use the term when accessing medical services. In contrast, 60% used the term "intersex" in some form to self-describe their sex characteristics. U.S. research by the Lurie Children's Hospital, Chicago, and the AIS-DSD Support Group (now InterConnect Support Group) published in 2017 found that "disorders of sex development" terminology may negatively affect care, give offense, and result in lower attendance at medical clinics.

A "dsd-LIFE" study in 2020 found that around 69% of 1,040 participants reported that DSD applied to their condition or that they felt neutral about the term, with most participants preferring terms that were specific to their somatic condition.

=== Human rights and community concerns ===
The term DSD (and particularly its association with medical disorders) has been controversial. The argument over terminology reflects a deeper disagreement over the extent to which intersex conditions require medical intervention, the appropriateness of certain interventions, and whether physicians and parents should make irreversible treatment decisions on behalf of young children if the condition is not life-threatening.

- Use of the term disorder of sex development (DSD) is controversial among many activists and community organizations due to the label "disorders". Many governments and international institutions use the term 'intersex' in preference to 'DSD', or have called for the review of medical classifications. In May 2019, more than 50 intersex-led organizations signed a multilingual joint statement condemning the introduction of "disorders of sex development" language into the International Classification of Diseases, stating that this causes "harm" and facilitates human rights violations, calling on the World Health Organization to publish clear policy to ensure that intersex medical interventions are "fully compatible with human rights norms".
- Lee et al. in a 2006 Consensus statement on management of intersex disorders proposed a system of nomenclature based on "disorders of sex development" for clinical use, suggesting that "terms such as intersex, pseudohermaphroditism, hermaphroditism, sex reversal, and gender based diagnostic labels are particularly controversial," may be perceived as pejorative, and are confusing to practitioners and parents alike. However, research by the Lurie Children's Hospital, Chicago, and the AIS-DSD Support Group published in 2017 found that affected persons, and care givers, object to the term, and that this may impact choice, access, and utilization of health care providers. Australian sociological research on people born with atypical sex characteristics, published in 2016, found that 3% of respondents choose the term "disorders of sex development" or "DSD" to define their sex characteristics, while 21% use the term when accessing medical services. In contrast, 60% used the term "intersex" in some form to self-describe their sex characteristics.
- A committee of the Senate of Australia found that labelling intersex as "pejorative" appeared to be a post-hoc rationalisation in the 2006 Consensus statement. It recommended a review of clinical use of the term.
- Alternative terms have been offered: Milton Diamond has suggested the use of "variation" or of "difference", Elizabeth Reis has suggested "divergence"; Liao and Simmonds suggest "diverse sex development". The latter suggestions would retain the initial D in DSD.
- The 2006 Consensus statement on management of intersex disorders stated that evidence for early surgery for cosmetic reasons is lacking, outcomes include "decreased sexual sensitivity" and long term outcome data is absent. A 2016 Global Disorders of Sex Development Update since 2006 states that there is "still no consensual attitude regarding indications, timing, procedure and evaluation of outcome of DSD surgery" and "no evidence regarding the impact of surgically treated or non-treated DSDs during childhood for the individual, the parents, society or the risk of stigmatization".
- In 2013, Juan E. Méndez, the United Nations Special Rapporteur on torture and other cruel, inhuman or degrading treatment or punishment, condemned "irreversible sex assignment, involuntary sterilization, involuntary genital normalizing surgery, performed without their informed consent, or that of their parents, 'in an attempt to fix their sex'" stating that "members of sexual minorities are disproportionately subjected to torture and other forms of ill-treatment because they fail to conform to socially constructed gender expectations".
- In May 2014, the World Health Organization issued a joint statement on Eliminating forced, coercive and otherwise involuntary sterilization, An interagency statement with the OHCHR, UN Women, UNAIDS, UNDP, UNFPA and UNICEF. Referencing the involuntary surgical "sex-normalising or other procedures" on "intersex persons", the report recommends a range of guiding principles for medical treatment, including ensuring patient autonomy in decision-making, ensuring non-discrimination, accountability and access to remedies.
- During 2015, the Council of Europe and Inter-American Commission on Human Rights called for a review of medical classifications that may unnecessarily medicalize intersex traits, an end to medical interventions without consent, and improved disclosure. The Council of Europe's Human Rights Commissioner recommended:

National and international medical classifications which pathologise variations in sex characteristics should be reviewed with a view to eliminating obstacles to the effective enjoyment, by intersex persons, of human rights, including the right to the highest attainable standard of health.

- The European Union Agency for Fundamental Rights and UN Treaty Bodies have called for informed consent by individuals subjected to medical treatment, improved disclosure, and access to redress.

=== Clinical disagreements about the term ===
While the 2006 clinical consensus statement that introduced the term, its 2016 update, included some sex chromosome anomalies within the term DSD, the inclusion of those conditions is opposed by some clinicians. Medical historian David Griffiths has identified continued controversy about the relationship between sex chromosome variations and intersex/DSD classifications.

Similarly, some clinicians have proposed that congenital adrenal hyperplasia be excluded. Human rights advocate Morgan Carpenter has remarked that this proposal appears motivated by support for contentious medical interventions.

A member of the legal committee for the World Professional Association for Transgender Health and co-founder of the Australian and New Zealand Professional Association for Transgender Health has described "transsexualism" as "an intersex condition and a disorder of sexual development therapeutically medically treated by hormonal therapy and Genital Reassignment Surgery". Such views are contested.

=== People with DSDs competing in sporting events ===
There is particular contention around female-presenting athletes with DSDs (which can cause an elevated level of testosterone) competing in female-only sports events. World Athletics claimed that while 46 XY DSD occurs in roughly 1 in 20,000 people in the general population, it is found in about 7 in 1,000 elite female athletes (with a prevalence 140 times higher), arguing that this offers significant performance advantage. Within the scientific community, there is ongoing debate over whether any physiological advantage in fact exists.

== See also ==
- Intersex medical interventions
- Intersex healthcare
- Patient support group
- Sex chromosome anomalies
