= Partial androgen insensitivity syndrome =

- Other names: Partial androgen resistance syndrome; Reifenstein syndrome
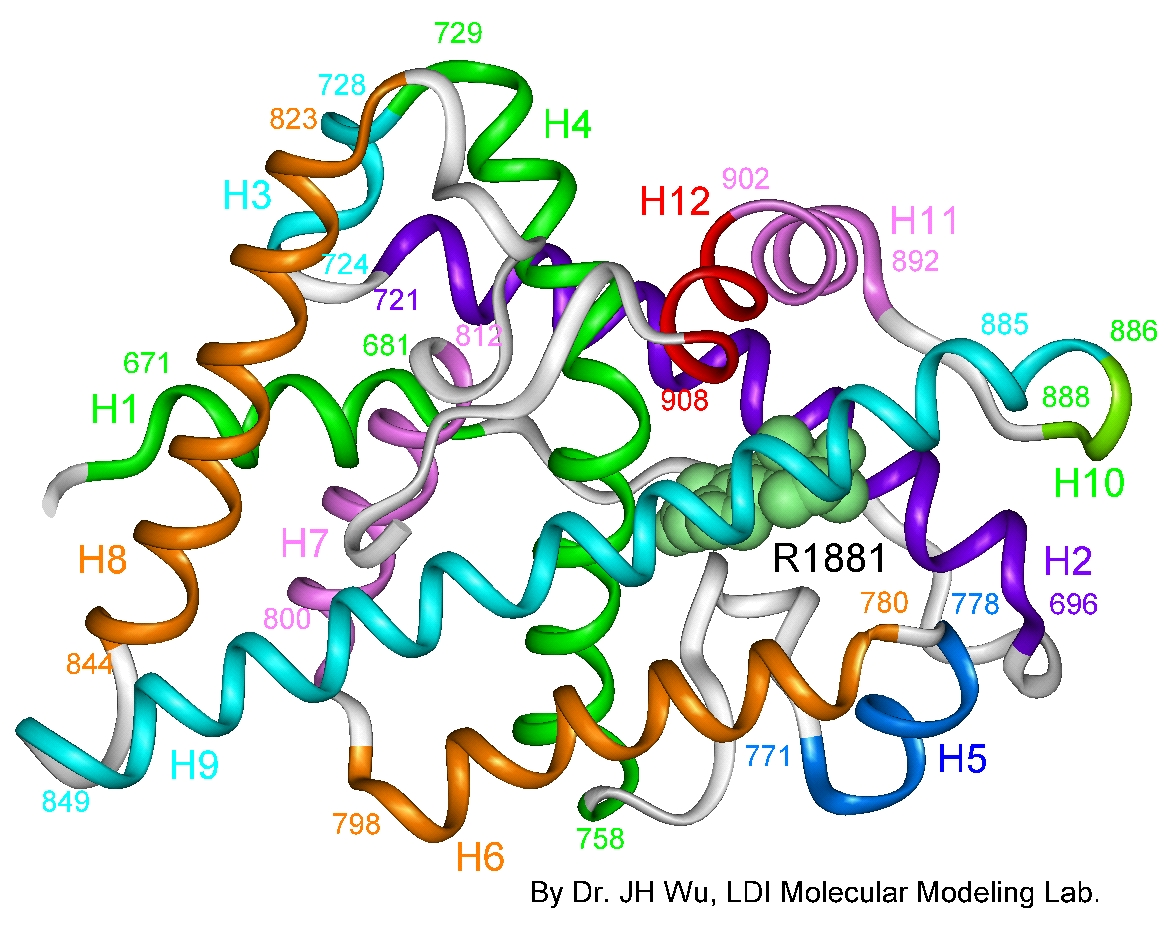
- AIS results when the function of the androgen receptor (AR) is impaired. The AR protein (pictured) mediates the effects of androgens in the human body.
- Specialty: Endocrinology

Partial androgen insensitivity syndrome (PAIS) is a condition that results in the partial inability of the cell to respond to androgens. It is an X linked recessive condition. The partial unresponsiveness of the cell to the presence of androgenic hormones impairs the masculinization of male genitalia in the developing fetus, as well as the development of male secondary sexual characteristics at puberty, but does not significantly impair female genital or sexual development. As such, the insensitivity to androgens is clinically significant only when it occurs in individuals with a Y chromosome (or more specifically, an SRY gene). Clinical features include ambiguous genitalia at birth and primary amenhorrhoea with clitoromegaly with inguinal masses. Müllerian structures are not present in the individual.

PAIS is one of three types of androgen insensitivity syndrome, which is divided into three categories that are differentiated by the degree of genital masculinization: complete androgen insensitivity syndrome (CAIS) is indicated when the external genitalia is that of a typical female, mild androgen insensitivity syndrome (MAIS) is indicated when the external genitalia is that of a typical male, and partial androgen insensitivity syndrome (PAIS) is indicated when the external genitalia is partially, but not fully masculinized. Androgen insensitivity syndrome is the largest single entity that leads to 46,XY undermasculinization. PAIS has a similar presentation and is difficult to distinguish from 5α-reductase type 2 deficiency, especially before puberty.

There are differing opinions on whether treatment is necessary. Treatment may include irreversible and far reaching surgical operations such as gonadectomy, as well as hormone replacement therapy, or vaginoplasty if the patient has desire to engage in penetrative sex.

== Signs and symptoms ==
A supplemental system of phenotypic grading that uses seven classes instead of the traditional three was proposed by pediatric endocrinologist Charmian A. Quigley et al. in 1995. The first six grades of the scale, grades 1 through 6, are differentiated by the degree of genital masculinization; grade 1 is indicated when the external genitalia is fully masculinized, grade 6 is indicated when the external genitalia is fully feminized, and grades 2 through 5 quantify four degrees of increasingly feminized genitalia that lie in the interim. Grade 7 is indistinguishable from grade 6 until puberty, and is thereafter differentiated by the presence of secondary terminal hair; grade 6 is indicated when secondary terminal hair is present, whereas grade 7 is indicated when it is absent. The Quigley scale can be used in conjunction with the traditional three classes of AIS to provide additional information regarding the degree of genital masculinization, and is particularly useful when the diagnosis is PAIS.

Left, 19-year-old man with grade 3 PAIS before initiation of androgen therapy. Right, Habitus after 3.5 years of androgen treatment.

Partial androgen insensitivity syndrome is diagnosed when the degree of androgen insensitivity in an individual with a 46,XY karyotype is great enough to partially prevent the masculinization of the genitalia, but is not great enough to completely prevent genital masculinization. This includes any phenotype resulting from androgen insensitivity where the genitalia is partially, but not completely masculinized. Genital ambiguities are frequently detected during clinical examination at birth, and consequently, a PAIS diagnosis can be made during infancy as part of a differential diagnostic workup.

Pubertal undervirilization is common, including gynecomastia, decreased secondary terminal hair, and/or a high pitched voice. The phallic structure ranges from a penis with varying degrees of diminished size and hypospadias to a slightly enlarged clitoris. Wolffian structures (the epididymides, vasa deferentia, and seminal vesicles) are typically partially or fully developed. The prostate is typically small or impalpable. Müllerian remnants are rare, but have been reported.

The gonads in individuals with PAIS are testes, regardless of phenotype; during the embryonic stage of development, testes form in an androgen-independent process that occurs due to the influence of the SRY gene on the Y chromosome. Cryptorchidism is common, and carries with it a 50% risk of germ cell malignancy. If the testes are located intrascrotally, there may still be significant risk of germ cell malignancy; studies have not yet been published to assess this risk.

Predominantly male phenotypes vary in the degree of genital undermasculinization to include micropenis, chordee, bifid scrotum, and/or pseudovaginal perineoscrotal hypospadias. Impotence may be fairly common, depending on phenotypic features; in one study of 15 males with PAIS, 80% of those interviewed indicated that they had some degree of impotence. Anejaculation appears to occur somewhat independently of impotence; some men are still able to ejaculate despite impotence, and others without erectile difficulties cannot. Predominantly female phenotypes include a variable degree of labial fusion and clitoromegaly. Ambiguous phenotypic states include a phallic structure that is intermediate between a clitoris and a penis, and a single perineal orifice that connects to both the urethra and the vagina (i.e. urogenital sinus). At birth, it may not be possible to immediately differentiate the external genitalia of individuals with PAIS as being either male or female, although the majority of individuals with PAIS are raised male.

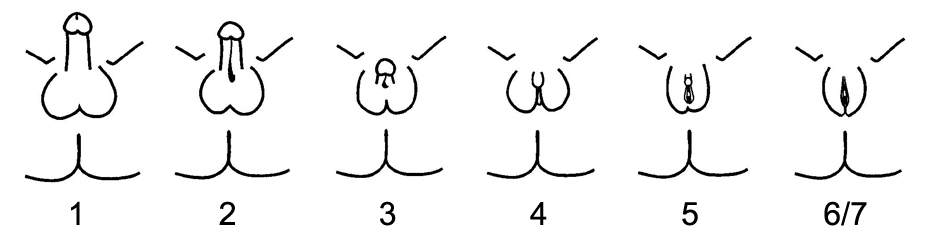
Schematic representation of the Quigley scale. Grades 2 through 5 quantify four degrees of increasingly feminized genitalia that correspond to PAIS. Grades 1 and 6/7 correspond to MAIS and CAIS, respectively.

Given the wide diversity of phenotypes associated with PAIS, the diagnosis is often further specified by assessing genital masculinization. Grades 2 through 5 of the Quigley scale quantify four degrees of increasingly feminized genitalia that correspond to PAIS.

Grade 2, the mildest form of PAIS, presents with a predominantly male phenotype that presents with minor signs of undermasculinized genitalia, such as isolated hypospadias, which can be severe. Hypospadias may manifest with a partially formed channel from the urethral opening to the glans. Until the 2000s, it was thought that isolated micropenis was not a manifestation of PAIS. However, in 2010, two cases of PAIS manifesting with isolated micropenis were documented.

Grade 4 PAIS with bifid scrotum, microphallus-like clitoris, and urethral orifice with terminal sinus urogenitalis

Grade 3, the most common phenotypic form of PAIS, features a predominantly male phenotype that is more severely undermasculinized, and typically presents with micropenis and pseudovaginal perineoscrotal hypospadias with bifid scrotum.

Grade 4 presents with a gender ambiguous phenotype, including a phallic structure that is intermediate between a clitoris and a penis. The urethra typically opens into a common channel with the vagina (i.e. urogenital sinus).

Grade 5, the form of PAIS with the greatest degree of androgen insensitivity, presents with a mostly female phenotype, including separate urethral and vaginal orifices, but also shows signs of slight masculinization including mild clitoromegaly and/or partial labial fusion.

Previously, it was erroneously thought that individuals with PAIS were always infertile; at least one case report has been published that describes fertile men that fit the criteria for grade 2 PAIS (micropenis, penile hypospadias, and gynecomastia).

=== Comorbidity ===
Histopathology of testicular tissue showing immature germ cells and spermatogonia with decreased tubular diameter. Scattered groups of Leydig cells appearing immature.

All forms of androgen insensitivity are associated with infertility, though exceptions have been reported for both the mild and partial forms.

PAIS is associated with a 50% risk of germ cell malignancy when the testes are undescended. If the testes are located intrascrotally, there may still be significant risk of germ cell malignancy; studies have not yet been published to assess this risk. Some men with PAIS may experience sexual dysfunction including impotence and anejaculation. A few AR mutations that cause PAIS are also associated with prostate and breast cancers.

Vaginal hypoplasia, a relatively frequent finding in CAIS and some forms of PAIS, is associated with sexual difficulties including vaginal penetration difficulties and dyspareunia.

There are indications that individuals with an intersex condition may be more prone to psychological difficulties, due at least in part to parental attitudes and behaviors, and concludes that preventative long-term psychological counseling for parents as well as for affected individuals should be initiated at the time of diagnosis. More recent research based on interviews of people with intersex variations indicate a need for more family protection from intervention and more family support.

Lifespan is not thought to be affected by AIS.

== Diagnosis ==
Unfortunately, the number of differentials to consider for PAIS is particularly large. Prompt diagnosis is particularly urgent when a child is born with ambiguous genitalia, as some causes are associated with potentially life-threatening adrenal crises. Determination of testosterone, testosterone precursors and dihydrotestosterone (DHT) at baseline and / or after human chorionic gonadotropin (hCG) stimulation can be used to exclude such defects in androgen biosynthesis.

Approximately one half of all 46,XY individuals born with ambiguous genitalia will not receive a definitive diagnosis. Androgen receptor (AR) gene mutations cannot be found in 27% to 72% of individuals with PAIS. As a result, genetic analysis can be used to confirm a diagnosis of PAIS, but it cannot be used to rule out PAIS. Evidence of abnormal androgen binding in a genital skin fibroblast study has long been the gold standard for the diagnosis of PAIS, even when an AR mutation is not present. However, some cases of PAIS, including AR-mutant-positive cases, will show normal androgen binding. A family history consistent with X-linked inheritance is more commonly found in AR-mutant-positive cases than AR-mutant-negative cases.

The use of dynamic endocrine tests is particularly helpful in isolating a diagnosis of PAIS. One such test is the human chorionic gonadotropin (hCG) stimulation test. If the gonads are testes, there will be an increase in the level of serum testosterone in response to the hCG, regardless of testicular descent. The magnitude of the testosterone increase can help differentiate between androgen resistance and gonadal dysgenesis, as does evidence of a uterus on ultrasound examination. Testicular function can also be assessed by measuring serum anti-Müllerian hormone levels, which in turn can further differentiate PAIS from gonadal dysgenesis and bilateral anorchia.

Another useful dynamic test involves measuring the response to exogenous steroids; individuals with AIS show a decreased response in serum sex hormone binding globulin (SHBG) after a short term administration of anabolic steroids. Two studies indicate that measuring the response in SHBG after the administration of stanozolol could help to differentiate individuals with PAIS from those with other causes of ambiguous genitalia, although the response in individuals with predominantly male phenotypes overlaps somewhat with the response in normal males.

== Management ==
Management of AIS is currently limited to symptomatic management; methods to correct a malfunctioning androgen receptor protein that result from an AR gene mutation are not currently available. Areas of management include sex assignment, genitoplasty, gonadectomy in relation to tumor risk, hormone replacement therapy, and genetic and psychological counseling. Non-consensual interventions are still often performed, although general awareness on the resulting psychological traumatization is rising.

=== Sex assignment ===
The decision of whether to raise an individual with PAIS as a boy or a girl may not be obvious; grades 3 and 4 in particular present with a phenotype that may be difficult to classify as primarily male or female, and some will be incapable of virilization at puberty. Parents of an affected newborn should seek immediate help at a center with an experienced multidisciplinary team, and should avoid gender assignment beforehand. Older guidelines from 2006 advised against waiting for the child to decide for themselves. According to them, key considerations involved in assigning gender include the appearance of the genitalia, the extent to which the child can virilize at puberty, surgical options and the postoperative sexual function of the genitalia, genitoplasty complexity, potential for fertility, and the projected gender identity of the child. The majority of individuals with PAIS are raised male, although a large portion are assigned female. More recently, the interests of intersex people themselves are being taken into consideration by the medical community. Some parents have pushed their children with intersex variations to display gender normative roles and behaviours, or to engage in hormonal and surgical interventions to make their bodies appear more aesthetically 'normative'. Research based on interviews of people with intersex variations indicate a need for more family protection from intervention and more family support. Intersex people who have been involuntarily surgically altered at birth often suffer from depression, anxiety, and gender dysphoria. The World Health Organization (WHO) standard of care is to delay surgery until the child is old enough to participate in informed consent, performing intersex genital surgeries on newborn infants is considered a human rights violation, including by the WHO.

Virilization capacity can be assessed by measuring the response to a trial of exogenous androgens; some studies have measured the growth of the phallus in response to exogenous testosterone or dihydrotestosterone, while others have measured the change in sex hormone binding globulin (SHBG) in response to the artificial androgen stanozolol to assess androgen sensitivity. Some experts have cautioned that it remains to be proved that a good response to exogenous androgens in neonates is a good predictor of androgen response at puberty. If a mutation in the AR gene is found, it is important to determine whether the mutation is inherited or de novo (i.e. a somatic mutation); a certain amount of the wild-type androgen receptor will be present in cases of somatic mutation, which can induce virilization at puberty. A genital skin fibroblast study and a human chorionic gonadotropin (hCG) stimulation test may also provide information helpful in the assessment of virilization capacity.

Psychosexual development is influenced by many factors, including the timing, amount, and type of androgen exposure, receptor functionality, and environment, and is thus difficult to predict. Gender identity begins to develop before 3 years of age, although the earliest age at which it can be reliably assessed has yet to be determined. Approximately 25% of individuals with PAIS are dissatisfied with their assigned gender, regardless of being raised as male or female. One study reports that 46,XY individuals born with micropenis and no hypospadias are better off being raised male, despite the success of some being raised female. Studies involving the more ambiguous phenotypic forms of PAIS are less decisive. Homosexuality with respect to assigned gender and atypical gender role behavior are known to occur more frequently in individuals with PAIS, and may occur with or without gender dysphoria; neither should be interpreted as an indication of incorrect gender assignment. If an affected child does express feelings of gender dysphoria, the opportunity to explore such feelings with a psychologist experienced in treating intersex conditions should be accommodated. If feelings of gender dysphoria persist, gender reassignment should be initiated, possibly with the aid of a specialist in the field.

=== Genitoplasty ===
Genitoplasty, unlike gender assignment, can be irreversible, and there is no guarantee that adult gender identity will develop as assigned despite surgical intervention. Some aspects of genitoplasty are still being debated; a variety of different opinions have been presented by professionals, self-help groups, and patients over the last few decades. Points of consideration include what conditions justify genitoplasty, the extent and type of genitoplasty that should be employed, when genitoplasty should be performed, and what the goals of genitoplasty should be. Gender assignment itself does not predicate the need for immediate genitoplasty; in some cases, surgical intervention can be delayed to allow the affected child to reach an age and maturity sufficient to have a role in such decisions. Some studies suggest that early surgeries can still produce satisfactory outcomes, while others suggest it to be unlikely. Even surgeries that are planned as one-stage procedures often require further major surgery. Scarring and tissue loss that result from repeated surgical procedures are of particular concern, due to the presumed negative impact on sexual function.

While it is thought that feminizing genitoplasty typically requires fewer surgeries to achieve an acceptable result and results in fewer urologic difficulties, there is no evidence that feminizing surgery results in a better psychosocial outcome. In one study, individuals with grade 3 PAIS who were raised male rated their body image and sexual function similarly to those who were raised female, even though they were more likely to have genitalia that were abnormal in size and appearance; more than half of the male participants had a stretched penile length that was below 2.5 standard deviations of the mean, while only 6% of female participants presented with a short vagina in adulthood, and participating physicians gave a lower cosmetic rating to the surgical results of the men than the women. Both male and female participants cited the appearance of their genitalia as being the greatest contributing factor to their dissatisfaction with their body image. In two larger studies, the common predictor of gender reassignment was stigmatization related to having an intersex condition.

The outcome of masculinizing genitoplasty is dependent on the amount of erectile tissue and the extent of hypospadias. Procedures include correction of penile curvature and chordee, reconstruction of the urethra, hypospadias correction, orchidopexy, and Müllerian remnant removal to prevent infection and pseudo-incontinence. Erectile prosthesis may be inserted in cases of successful neophalloplasty in adulthood, although it has a high morbidity. Additional surgeries may be required to correct postsurgical complications such as stenosis of the anastomosis between the native urethra and the graft, urethral fistulas, and posterior displacement of the balanic meatus. Successful masculinizing genitoplasty performed on individuals with grade 3 PAIS often requires multiple surgeries.

A 15-year-old female with a history of CAH who underwent a single-stage feminizing genitoplasty-reduction clitoroplasty and a pull-through vaginoplasty at 2 years of age. She presented with pain and enlargement of the clitoral region.

If feminizing genitoplasty is performed in infancy, the result will need to be refined at puberty through additional surgery. Procedures include clitoral reduction / recession, labiaplasty, repair of the common urogenital sinus, vaginoplasty, and vaginal dilation through non-surgical pressure methods. Clitoral reduction / recession surgery carries with it the risk of necrosis as well as the risk of impairing the sexual function of the genitalia, and thus should not be performed for less severe clitoromegaly. Clitoral surgery should be focused on function rather than appearance, with care being taken to spare the erectile function and innervation of the clitoris. If PAIS presents with a common urogenital sinus, the American Academy of Pediatrics currently recommends that surgery to separate the urethra from the vagina be performed at an early age. As is the case for CAIS, vaginal dilation using pressure dilation methods should be attempted before the surgical creation of a neovagina is considered, and neither should be performed before puberty. Complications of feminizing genitoplasty can include vaginal stenosis, meatal stenosis, vaginourethral fistula, female hypospadias, urinary tract injuries, and recurrent clitoromegaly. Successful feminizing genitoplasty performed on individuals with grade 3 PAIS often requires multiple surgeries, although more surgeries are typically required for successful masculinizing genitoplasty in this population.

Many surgical procedures have been developed to create a neovagina, as none of them is ideal. Surgical intervention should be considered only after non-surgical pressure dilation methods have failed to produce a satisfactory result. Neovaginoplasty can be performed using skin grafts, a segment of bowel, ileum, peritoneum, Interceed, buccal mucosa, amnion, or dura mater. Success of such methods should be determined by sexual function, and not by vaginal length alone, as has been done in the past. Ileal or cecal segments may be problematic because of a shorter mesentery, which may produce tension on the neovagina, leading to stenosis. The sigmoid neovagina is thought to be self-lubricating, without the excess mucus production associated with segments of small bowel. Vaginoplasty may create scarring at the introitus (the vaginal opening), requiring additional surgery to correct. Vaginal dilators are required postoperatively to prevent vaginal stenosis from scarring. Other complications include bladder and bowel injuries. Yearly exams are required, as neovaginoplasty carries a risk of carcinoma, although carcinoma of the neovagina is uncommon. Neither neovaginoplasty nor vaginal dilation should be performed before puberty.

=== Gonadectomy ===
Gonadectomy at time of diagnosis is the current recommendation for PAIS if presenting with cryptorchidism. The risk of malignancy when testes are located intrascrotally is unknown; the current recommendation is to biopsy the testes at puberty, allowing investigation of at least 30 seminiferous tubules, with diagnosis preferably based on OCT3/4 immunohistochemistry, followed by regular examinations. Hormone replacement therapy is required after gonadectomy, and should be modulated over time to replicate the hormone levels naturally present in the body during the various stages of puberty. Artificially induced puberty results in the same, normal development of secondary sexual characteristics, growth spurt, and bone mineral accumulation. Women with PAIS may have a tendency towards bone mineralization deficiency, although this increase is thought to be less than is typically seen in CAIS, and is similarly managed.

=== Hormonal replacement therapy ===
Testosterone has been used to successfully treat undervirilization in some but not all men with PAIS, despite having supraphysiological levels of testosterone to start with. Treatment options include transdermal gels or patches, oral or injectable testosterone undecanoate, other injectable testosterone esters, testosterone pellets, or buccal testosterone systems. Supraphysiological doses may be required to achieve the desired physiological effect, which may be difficult to achieve using non-injectable testosterone preparations. Exogenous testosterone supplementation in unaffected men can produce various unwanted side effects, including prostatic hypertrophy, polycythemia, gynecomastia, hair loss, acne, and the suppression of the hypothalamic-pituitary-gonadal axis, resulting in the reduction of gonadotropins (i.e., luteinizing hormone and follicle-stimulating hormone) and spermatogenic defect. These effects may not manifest at all in men with AIS, or might only manifest at a much higher concentration of testosterone, depending on the degree of androgen insensitivity. Those undergoing high dose androgen therapy should be monitored for safety and efficacy of treatment, possibly including regular breast and prostate examinations. Some individuals with PAIS have a sufficiently high sperm count to father children; at least one case report has been published that describes fertile men who fit the criteria for grade 2 PAIS (micropenis, penile hypospadias, and gynecomastia). Several publications have indicated that testosterone treatment can correct low sperm counts in men with MAIS. At least one case report has been published that documents the efficacy of treating a low sperm-count with tamoxifen in an individual with PAIS.

=== Counseling ===
Depending on phenotypic features, impotence and other sexual problems such as anejaculation or sexual aversion may be fairly common among individuals with PAIS, but do not necessarily indicate low libido. Support groups for individuals with PAIS may help affected individuals discuss their concerns more comfortably. Some individuals with PAIS may try to avoid intimate relationships out of fear of rejection; individual therapy may help some to overcome social anxiety, and restore focus to interpersonal relationships instead of solely on sexual function and activity.

== Society and culture ==
Adults with partial androgen insensitivity syndrome include Australian-Maltese advocate Tony Briffa, considered to be the world's first openly intersex mayor and public office-bearer. Briffa served as Deputy Mayor of the City of Hobsons Bay, Victoria, between 2009 and 2011, and Mayor between 2011 and 2012.

In history, the Roman sophist and philosopher Favorinus of Arelate has been described as having partial androgen insensitivity syndrome.

=== Notable people with PAIS ===
- Tony Briffa
- Small Luk
- Eliana Rubashkyn
- Sean Saifa Wall
- Sogto Ochirov

=== Sentencia SU 337/99, Colombia ===
In Sentencia SU-337/99, of May 12, 1999, the Constitutional Court of Colombia determined that "qualified and persistent" informed consent is required for genital surgeries in children. The Court ruled in the case of XX, an 8-year old with ambiguous genitalia, androgen insensitivity and XY chromosomes, raised as a girl. Doctors recommended feminizing surgeries, including a gonadectomy, vaginoplasty and clitoroplasty before puberty, but the hospital would not proceed without the consent of the Colombian Institute of Family Welfare and the Office of the Public Advocate. The mother brought a case against Institute and Office of the Public Advocate, seeking to provide substitute consent. The mother argued that "the capacity to decide, it would be too late and would prevent normal psychological, physical, and social development".

The Court refused the mother's claim. It questioned the urgency of the case, argued by medical teams. Civil rights advocates and a minority of doctors favored deferring treatment due to lack of evidence and the irreversible nature of the proposed interventions. The Court observed that advocates of surgery were more numerous than opponents, alternatives to surgery were not entirely feasible, and surgeries had improved, "making it less likely that sexual sensitivity would be destroyed; and the medical community was improving communication with parents".

The Court determined that a constitutional protection of a right to free development of personality meant that a child's autonomy increases with age, including the development of a gender identity and bodily awareness. It determined that the best interests of the child were protected by allowing the child to determine their own gender identity. The Court determined that genital surgeries should not be conducted on children over the age of five, and that multidisciplinary teams should assess children's needs on a case-by-case basis.
