= Complete androgen insensitivity syndrome =

Medical condition

- Other names: Complete androgen resistance syndrome
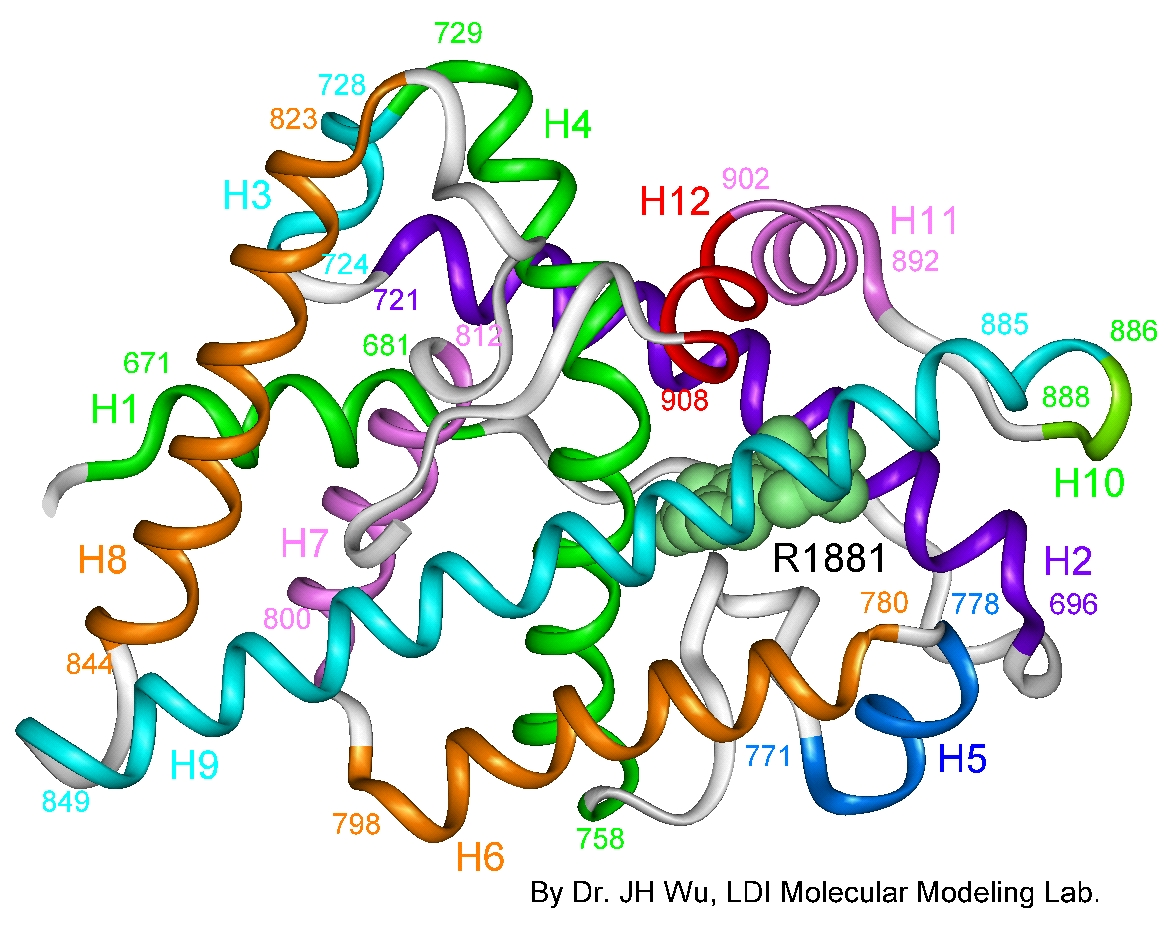
- AIS results when the function of the androgen receptor (AR) is impaired. The AR protein (pictured) mediates the effects of androgens in the human body.
- Specialty: Gynaecology, endocrinology
- Frequency: 0.0005%

Complete androgen insensitivity syndrome (CAIS) is an AIS condition that results in the complete inability of the cell to respond to androgens. As such, the insensitivity to androgens is only clinically significant when it occurs in individuals who are exposed to significant amounts of testosterone at some point in their lives. The unresponsiveness of the cell to the presence of androgenic hormones prevents the masculinization of male genitalia in the developing fetus, as well as the development of male secondary sexual characteristics at puberty, but does allow, without significant impairment, female genital and sexual development in those with the condition.

All human fetuses begin fetal development looking similar, with both the Müllerian duct system (female) and the Wolffian duct system (male) developing. Sex differentiation begins with the gonads, which in XX individuals become ovaries, and in XY individuals (including those with CAIS) typically become testicles due to the presence of the Y chromosome. It is at the seventh week of gestation that the bodies of non-CAIS individuals with the XY karyotype begin their masculinization: i.e., the Wolffian duct system is promoted and the Müllerian duct system is suppressed (the reverse happens with typically developing females). This process is triggered by androgens produced by the testicles. The bodies of unaffected XY individuals masculinize by, among other things, enlarging the genital tubercle into a penis, which in females becomes the clitoris, while what in females becomes the labia fuses to become the scrotum of males (where the testicles will later descend).

XY individuals affected by CAIS develop a normal external female habitus, despite the presence of a Y chromosome, but internally, they will lack a uterus, and the vaginal cavity will be shallow, while the gonads, which differentiated into testes in the earlier separate process also triggered by their Y chromosome, will remain undescended in the place. This results not only in infertility in individuals with CAIS, but also presents a risk of gonadal cancer later on in life.

CAIS is one of the three categories of androgen insensitivity syndrome (AIS) since AIS is differentiated according to the degree of genital masculinization: complete androgen insensitivity syndrome (CAIS) when the external genitalia is that of a typical female, mild androgen insensitivity syndrome (MAIS) when the external genitalia is that of a typical male, and partial androgen insensitivity syndrome (PAIS) when the external genitalia is partially, but not fully masculinized.

Androgen insensitivity syndrome is the largest single entity that leads to 46,XY undermasculinization.

== Signs and symptoms ==
=== Physical ===
Persons with a complete androgen insensitivity have a typical female external phenotype, despite having a 46,XY karyotype.

Individuals with complete androgen insensitivity syndrome (grades 6 and 7 on the Quigley scale) are born with an external female phenotype, without any signs of genital masculinization, despite having a 46,XY karyotype. CAIS is usually recognized at puberty, which may be slightly delayed, but is otherwise normal except for absent menses and diminished or absent secondary terminal hair. Axillary hair (i.e. armpit hair) fails to develop in one third of all cases. The vulva is normal, although the labia and clitoris are sometimes underdeveloped. Vaginal depth varies widely for CAIS, but is typically shorter than normal; one study of eight people with CAIS measured the average vaginal depth to be 5.9 cm (vs. 11.1 ± 1.0 cm for unaffected women). In some extreme cases, the vagina has been reported to be aplastic (resembling a "dimple"), though the exact incidence of this is unknown.

The gonads in people with CAIS are testes; during the embryonic stage of development, testes form in an androgen-independent process that occurs due to the influence of the SRY gene on the Y chromosome. They may be located intra-abdominally, at the internal inguinal ring, or may herniate into the labia majora, often leading to the discovery of the condition. Testes in those affected have been found to be atrophic upon gonadectomy.

Testosterone produced by the testes cannot be directly used due to the mutant androgen receptor that characterizes CAIS; instead, it is aromatized into estrogen, which effectively feminizes the body and accounts for the normal female phenotype observed in CAIS. However, up to 5% of individuals with CAIS do not have an AR mutation. The receptor in question is encoded by the AR gene located on the X chromosome at Xq11–12. At least 15 different mutations were known in 2003, and they are all recessive, which makes the disease follow X-linked recessive inheritance.

Immature sperm cells in the testes do not mature past an early stage, as sensitivity to androgens is required in order for spermatogenesis to complete. Germ cell malignancy risk, once thought to be relatively high, is now thought to be approximately 2%. Wolffian structures (the epididymides, vasa deferentia, and seminal vesicles) are typically absent, but will develop at least partially in approximately 30% of cases, depending on which mutation is causing the CAIS. The prostate, like the external male genitalia, cannot masculinize in the absence of androgen receptor function, and thus remains in the female form.

The Müllerian system typically regresses the same way it does in unaffected male fetuses due to anti-Müllerian hormone originating from the Sertoli cells of the testes. Thus, people with CAIS, despite having a vagina due to androgen insensitivity, are born without fallopian tubes, a cervix, or a uterus, and the vagina ends "blindly" in a pouch. Müllerian regression does not fully complete in some cases of CAIS, resulting in Müllerian "remnants". Although rare, a few cases of people diagnosed with CAIS and having Müllerian structures have been reported. In one exceptional case, a 22-year-old with CAIS was found to have a cervix, uterus, and fallopian tubes. In an unrelated case, an almost fully developed uterus was found in a 22-year-old adult with CAIS.

Other subtle differences that have been reported include slightly longer limbs and larger hands and feet due to a proportionally greater stature than unaffected women, larger teeth, minimal or no acne, well developed breasts, a greater incidence of meibomian gland dysfunction (i.e. dry eye syndromes and light sensitivity), and dry skin and hair resulting from a lack of sebum production.

=== Endocrine ===
Hormone levels have been reported in gonadally intact people with CAIS in a number of studies. Hormone levels are similar to those of males, including high testosterone levels and relatively low estradiol levels. However, luteinizing hormone (LH) levels are elevated while sex hormone-binding globulin (SHBG) levels are more consistent with those of females. People with CAIS have low levels of progesterone similarly to males. The production rates of testosterone, estradiol, and estrone have been reported to be higher in gonadally intact with CAIS than in men.

Hormone levels in gonadally intact adolescent and adult females with complete androgen insensitivity syndrome
Study	Location	n	Age (years)	LH (IU/L)	FSH (IU/L)	T (ng/dL)	DHT (ng/dL)	E2 (pg/mL)	P4 (ng/mL)	SHBG (nmol/L)
Schindler (1975)	Tübingen, DE	4	? (17–22)	?^{a}	?^{a}	1040 ± 300	79 ± 30	36.7 ± 7.1	0.06 ± 0.02	?
Blumenthal (1982)	Johannesburg, ZA	4	19 (18–28)	70 (8–97)	14 (6–22)	1356 (1240–1577)	?	40 (26–79)	0.96 (0.68–1.76)	?
Melo (2003)	Sao Paulo, BR	8	16.5 (14–34)	26 (14–43)	7.4 (3.5–16)	346 (173–1040)	?	30 (22–40)	?	?
Audi (2010)	Barcelona, ES	11	20 (13.5–40)	10 (<0.1–35)	2.3 (0.4–23.4)	576 (144–1350)	?	33 (20–73)	?	52 (22–128)
Doehnert (2015)	Lübeck, DE/Pisa, IT	42	17.3 (14–50)	18.5 (5.5–51.1)	3.5 (0.4–16.3)	576 (173–1450)	?	31 (5–70)	?	53 (15–99)
King (2017)	London, UK	31	19.7 (13.4–52.3)	24.2 (13–59.1)	4.6 (1.1–68.9)	640 (233–1260)	?	35 (12–63)	?	?
Jumani (2024)	Bethesda, US	7	16.5 (13.3–23.8)	31.2 (4.6–56.7)	20.3 (1.2–56.2)	695 (283–1300)	?	17.7 (14–26)	?	?
Male ref. range	–	–	Adult	1–10	1–7	346 (202–1010)	?	30 (10–50)	<0.6	10–50
Female ref. range	–	–	Adult	2–6.6	2–6.6	43 (20–86)	?	80 (10–395)	<3.2–25	30–90
Abbreviations: LH = Luteinizing hormone. FSH = Follicle-stimulating hormone. T = Testosterone. DHT = Dihydrotestosterone. E2 = Estradiol. P4 = Progesterone. SHBG = Sex hormone-binding globulin. Notes: Values are mean (range) or mean ± standard deviation. Footnotes: ^{a} = LH = 73.2 ± 9.2 ng LER 907/mL, FSH = 40.2 ± 20.0 ng LER 907/mL. Sources: See template.

=== Comorbidity ===
Histopathology of testicular tissue showing immature germ cells and spermatagonia with decreased tubular diameter. Scattered groups of Leydig cells appearing immature.

All forms of androgen insensitivity, including CAIS, are associated with infertility, though exceptions have been reported for both the mild and partial forms.

CAIS is associated with a decreased bone mineral density. Some have hypothesized that the decreased bone mineral density observed in women with CAIS is related to the timing of gonadectomy and inadequate estrogen supplementation. However, recent studies show that bone mineral density is similar whether gonadectomy occurs before or after puberty, and is decreased despite estrogen supplementation, leading some to hypothesize that the deficiency is directly attributable to the role of androgens in bone mineralization.

CAIS is also associated with an increased risk for gonadal tumors (e.g. germ cell malignancy) in adulthood if gonadectomy is not performed. The risk of malignant germ cell tumors in women with CAIS increases with age and has been estimated to be 3.6% at 25 years and 33% at 50 years. The incidence of gonadal tumors in childhood is thought to be relatively low; a recent review of the medical literature found that only three cases of malignant germ cell tumors in prepubescent girls have been reported in association with CAIS in the last 100 years. Some have estimated the incidence of germ cell malignancy to be as low as 0.8% before puberty.

Vaginal hypoplasia, a relatively frequent finding in CAIS and some forms of PAIS, is associated with sexual difficulties including vaginal penetration difficulties and dyspareunia.

At least one study indicates that individuals with a DSD condition may be more prone to psychological difficulties, due at least in part to parental attitudes and behaviors, and concludes that preventative long-term psychological counseling for parents as well as for affected individuals should be initiated at the time of diagnosis. A retrospective study shows that the prevalence of anxiety and depressive disorders among CAIS individuals is approximately twice as high as in male referents without DSD, but no evident corresponding difference has been found compared to female referents.

Lifespan is not thought to be affected by AIS.

Despite the well-developed breasts in CAIS women, and for reasons that are not well-understood, breast cancer has never been reported in CAIS women and does not seem to occur or occurs only rarely. Only one case report of juvenile fibroadenoma exists. A few cases of breast cancer have been reported in individuals with partial androgen insensitivity syndrome.

In contrast to bone health, both transdermal estradiol treatment and testosterone treatment in women with CAIS results in worsening in lipid profiles. A case report in 2009 also shows that CAIS individuals with intact testes (with endogenous hormone) are more likely to be obese. A study which includes five CAIS and two PAIS adolescents with ages ranging from 15 to 24 shows elevated homeostatic model assessment for insulin resistance (HOMA-IR) scores for all subjects. Growing evidence indicates that complete androgen receptor (AR) dysfunction disrupts systemic metabolic homeostasis and neither external nor endogenous estrogen can normalize it.

AR absence is related to decrease in mature neutrophils in mice, but there is no evidence that human CAIS individuals have impaired neutrophil function. The proteome related to inflammation is predominantly inhibited in CAIS. Upregulation of IFN-β and IL-6 are reported in the blood of CAIS individuals. Leukocytes of CAIS individuals exhibit relative resistance to DNA damaging.

== Diagnosis ==
Bilateral inguinal hernia. CAIS is not usually suspected until after puberty unless an inguinal hernia presents.

CAIS is usually not suspected until the menses fail to develop at puberty, or an inguinal hernia presents during premenarche. As many as 1–2% of prepubertal girls that present with an inguinal hernia will also have CAIS.

A diagnosis of CAIS or Swyer syndrome can be made in utero by comparing a karyotype obtained by amniocentesis with the external genitalia of the fetus during a prenatal ultrasound. Many infants with CAIS do not experience the normal, spontaneous neonatal testosterone surge, a fact which can be diagnostically exploited by obtaining baseline luteinizing hormone and testosterone measurements, followed by a human chorionic gonadotropin (hCG) stimulation test.

The main differentials for CAIS are complete gonadal dysgenesis (Swyer syndrome) and Müllerian agenesis (Mayer-Rokitansky-Kuster-Hauser syndrome or MRKH). Both CAIS and Swyer syndrome are associated with a 46,XY karyotype, whereas MRKH is not; MRKH can thus be ruled out by checking for the presence of a Y chromosome, which can be done either by fluorescence in situ hybridization (FISH) analysis or on full karyotype. Swyer syndrome is distinguished by the presence of a uterus, poor breast development and shorter stature. The diagnosis of CAIS is confirmed when androgen receptor (AR) gene sequencing reveals a mutation, although up to 5% of individuals with CAIS do not have an AR mutation.

Up until the 1990s, a CAIS diagnosis was often hidden from the affected individual, the individual's family, or both. It is current practice to disclose the genotype at the time of diagnosis, particularly when the affected individual is at least of adolescent age. If the affected individual is a child or infant, it is generally up to the parents, often in conjunction with a psychologist, to decide when to disclose the diagnosis.

== Management ==
Management of AIS is currently limited to symptomatic management; methods to correct a malfunctioning androgen receptor protein that result from an AR gene mutation are not currently available. Areas of management include sex assignment, genitoplasty, gonadectomy in relation to tumor risk, hormone replacement therapy, and genetic and psychological counseling. Non-consensual interventions are still often performed, although general awareness on the resulting psychological traumatization is rising.

=== Sex assignment and sexuality ===
Most individuals with CAIS are raised as females. They are born with an external phenotype of a typical female and are thought to be usually heterosexual with a female gender identity; however, some research has suggested that individuals with CAIS are more likely to have more variable gender outcomes and a non-primarily heterosexual sexual orientation than relatively similar control groups of those with MRKH syndrome and polyendocrine metabolic ovarian syndrome (PMOS), contradicting this belief. At least two case studies have reported male gender identity in individuals with CAIS. A possible explanation is that sex chromosomes may directly affect neural system regardless of levels of gonadal steroids. A study observed a mixture of "male" and "female" neuronal coding in CAIS individuals.

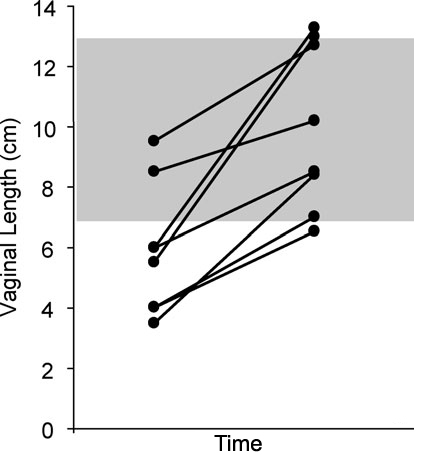
Vaginal length in 8 women with CAIS before and after dilation therapy as first line treatment. The normal reference range (shaded) is derived from 20 control women. Duration and extent of therapy varied; the median time to completion of treatment was 5.2 months, and the median number of 30-minute dilations per week was 5.

=== Dilation therapy ===
Most cases of vaginal hypoplasia associated with CAIS can be corrected using non-surgical pressure dilation methods. The elastic nature of vaginal tissue, as demonstrated by its ability to accommodate the differences in size between a tampon, a penis, and a baby's head, make dilation possible even in cases when the vaginal depth is significantly compromised. Treatment compliance is thought to be critical to achieve satisfactory results. Dilation can also be achieved via the Vecchietti procedure, which stretches vaginal tissues into a functional vagina using a traction device that is anchored to the abdominal wall, subperitoneal sutures, and a mold that is placed against the vaginal dimple. Vaginal stretching occurs by increasing the tension on the sutures, which is performed daily. The non-operative pressure dilation method is currently recommended as the first choice, since it is non-invasive, and highly successful. Vaginal dilation should not be performed before puberty.

=== Gonadectomy ===
While it was often recommended that women with CAIS eventually undergo gonadectomy to mitigate cancer risk, there are differing opinions regarding the necessity and timing of gonadectomy. The risk of malignant germ cell tumors with CAIS increases with age and has been estimated to be 3.6% at 25 years and 33% at 50 years. However, only three cases of malignant germ cell tumors in prepubescent girls with CAIS have been reported in the last 100 years. The youngest of these children was 14 years old. Individuals with CAIS naturally go through puberty via the aromatization of testosterone into estrogens. Therefore, removal of the gonads will result in an individual requiring hormone replacement therapy. Gonadectomy is generally not recommended before puberty to allow for puberty to occur spontaneously. Some individuals with CAIS may choose to go on testosterone HRT rather than estrogen. Research suggests that testosterone is at least as beneficial as estrogen replacement therapy and possibly improves outcomes in certain areas of well-being.

If gonadectomy is performed early, then puberty must be artificially induced using gradually increasing doses of estrogen. If gonadectomy is performed late, then puberty will occur on its own, due to the aromatization of testosterone into estrogen. At least one organization, the Australasian Paediatric Endocrine Group, classifies the cancer risk associated with CAIS as low enough to recommend against gonadectomy, although it warns that the cancer risk is still elevated above the general population, and that ongoing cancer monitoring is essential. Some choose to perform gonadectomy if and when inguinal hernia presents. Estrogen replacement therapy is critical to minimize bone mineral density deficiencies later in life.

==== Counter-arguments ====
Some individuals with CAIS may choose to retain their gonads. If this is the case, annual imaging of the gonads via MRI or ultrasound is recommended in order to monitor for signs of malignancy. Diagnostic laparoscopy and biopsy are also to be considered if imaging is ambiguous.

A study in 2012 claimed that adult women with CAIS are increasingly likely to keep their gonads due to perceived benefits. A retrospective study which includes postpubertal CAIS individuals seen at a single UK DSD center shows that there has been a temporal shift away from gonadectomy. 76.5% CAIS individuals between 2020 and 2025 elected to retain their gonads in this study. Endogenous hormone profiles show very specific features that influence bone health, hormonal replacement therapy may improve bone mineral density, but it does not normalize it. For individuals with CAIS who wish to keep their gonads, a biannual screening program is proposed. It may be possible to avoid gonadectomy throughout the patient's life with regular imaging and routine monitoring to ensure the gonads are healthy.

It is emphasized that not all imaging abnormalities are indicative of malignancy. Some activists consider that cancer risk is used to legitimate surgical and hormonal intervention because intersex bodies were positioned as inherently sick and in need of modification.

Research also suggest that timely intervention to reduce genotoxicity such as DNA damage, inflammation and imbalanced autophagy may promote germ cells specification and decrease the risk of germ cells tumor. It may allow to keep not only the gonads but also the potential of fertility in CAIS individuals.

=== Hormone replacement therapy ===
The doses of hormone replacement therapy (HRT) for CAIS individuals are debatable. Some have hypothesized that supraphysiological levels of estrogen may reduce the diminished bone mineral density associated with CAIS, while counter-arguments suggested a lower dose of HRT because levels of estrogen in CAIS individuals are normally below the female range before gonadectomy. Data has been published that suggests affected women who were not compliant with estrogen replacement therapy, or who had a lapse in estrogen replacement, experienced a more significant loss of bone mineral density. Progestin replacement therapy is usually seldom initiated as well. Androgen replacement has been reported to increase a sense of well-being in gonadectomized people with CAIS, although the mechanism by which this benefit is achieved is not well understood.

=== Counseling ===
It is no longer common practice to hide a diagnosis of CAIS from the affected individual or her family. Parents of children with CAIS need considerable support in planning and implementing disclosure for their child once the diagnosis has been established. For parents with young children, information disclosure is an ongoing, collaborative process requiring an individualized approach that evolves in concordance with the child's cognitive and psychological development. In all cases, the assistance of a psychologist experienced in the subject is recommended.

=== Neovaginal construction ===
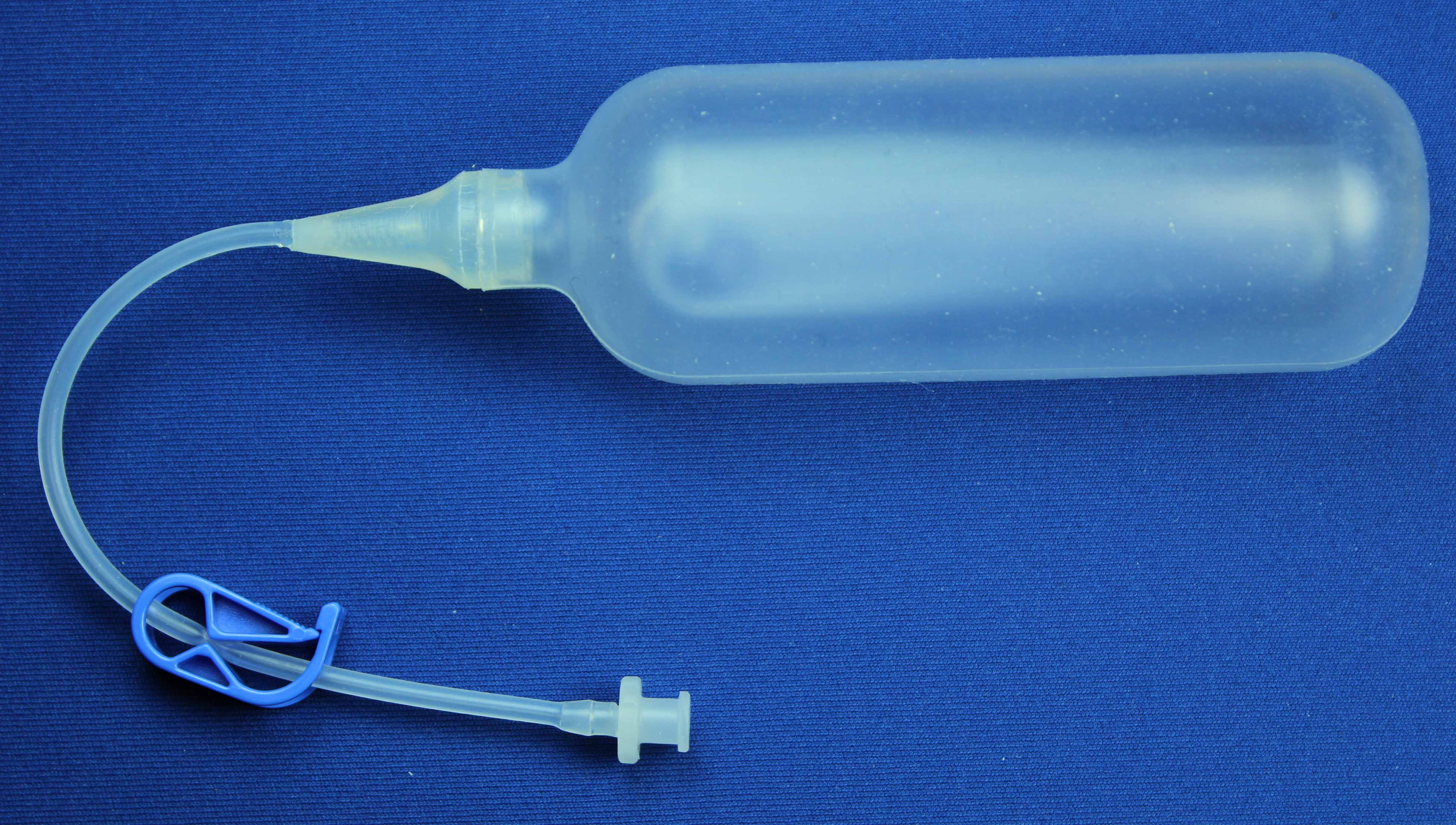
Vaginal expander ZSI 200 NS

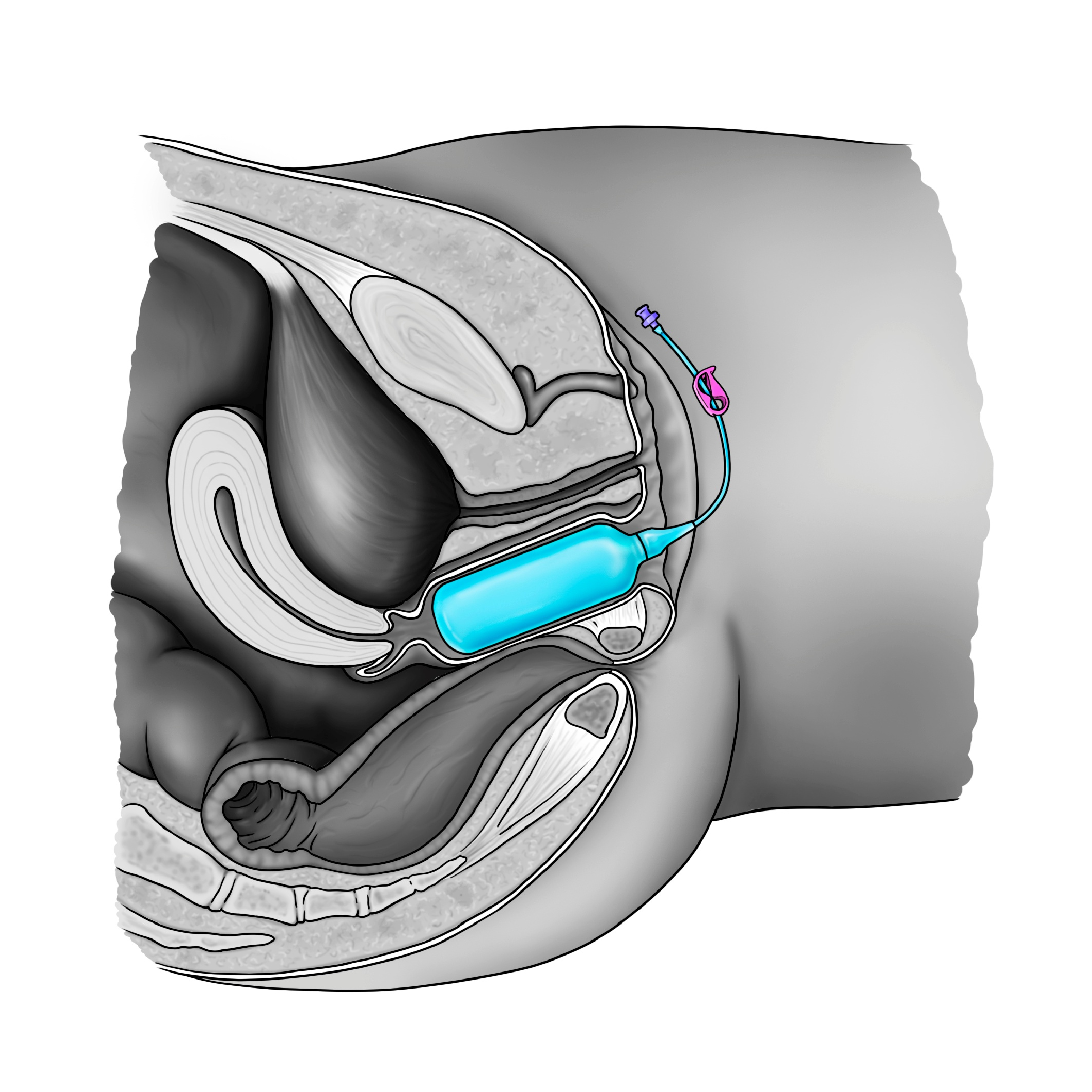
ZSI 200 NS vaginal expander stretching the female vagina

Many surgical procedures have been developed to create a neovagina, but none of them are ideal. Surgical intervention should only be considered after non-surgical pressure dilation methods have failed to produce a satisfactory result. A study in 2025 claims that vaginoplasty is not recommended in CAIS individuals. Neovaginoplasty can be performed using skin grafts, a segment of bowel, ileum, peritoneum, an absorbable adhesion barrier (Intercede, made by Johnson & Johnson), buccal mucosa, amnion, dura mater. or with the support of vaginal stents/expanders. Success of such methods should be determined by sexual function, and not just by vaginal length, as has been done in the past. Ileal or cecal segments may be problematic because of a shorter mesentery, which may produce tension on the neovagina, leading to stenosis. The sigmoid neovagina is thought to be self-lubricating, without the excess mucus production associated with segments of small bowel. Vaginoplasty may create scarring at the introitus (the vaginal opening), which requires additional surgery to correct. Vaginal dilators are required postoperatively to prevent vaginal stenosis from scarring. Inflatable vaginal stents are placed in the vagina deflated and then gently inflated. Other complications include bladder and bowel injuries. Yearly exams are required as neovaginoplasty carries a risk of carcinoma, although carcinoma of the neovagina is uncommon. Neither neovaginoplasty nor vaginal dilation should be performed before puberty.

=== Metabolic managements ===
Though metabolic dysfunction is common among CAIS individuals, there is no standard treatment. Clinical management relies heavily on symptomatic therapies. Regular monitoring of bone mineral density (BMD), blood glucose, and lipid profile is recommended. Besides HRT, supplementation with calcium and vitamin D should be considered in patients with reduced BMD. Bisphosphonates may be considered in patients with severe osteoporosis and/or fractures. For individuals with obesity, insulin resistance, or glucose dysregulation, metformin is the first-line therapy for improving insulin sensitivity and glycemic control. GLP-1RAs such as liraglutide and semaglutide may be efficacy and SGLT-2 inhibitors also hold promise for CAIS individuals with obesity or type 2 diabetes. Personalized advice on diet and exercise may be helpful as well.

== Prognosis ==
Challenges presented to people affected by this condition include: psychologically coming to terms with the condition, difficulties with sexual function, infertility. Long-term studies indicate that with appropriate medical and psychological treatment, those with CAIS can be satisfied with their sexual function and psychosexual development. Individuals with this condition can lead active lives and expect a normal lifespan.

== Epidemiology ==
It is estimated that CAIS occurs in 1 in 20,400 to 1 in 99,000 individuals with a 46,XY karyotype.

== Nomenclature ==
Historically, CAIS has been referred to in the literature under a number of other names, including testicular feminization [syndrome] (deprecated) and Morris syndrome. PAIS has also been referred to as Reifenstein syndrome, which should not be confused with CAIS.

== History ==
The first definitive description of CAIS was reported in 1817. The condition became more widely known after it was reviewed and named testicular feminization by American gynecologist John McLean Morris in 1953.

== People with CAIS ==
- Georgiann Davis
- Seven Graham
- Eden Atwood
- Alicia Roth Weigel

== See also ==
- Complete estrogen insensitivity syndrome
