= Prader =

Prader may refer to:

- Andrea Prader (1919–2001)
- Prader–Willi syndrome
- Prader scale
