= Orchidometer =

Measurement device for testicle volume

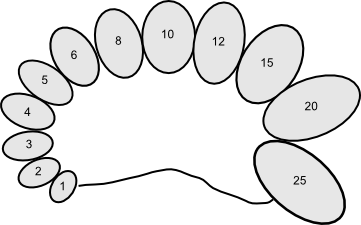
A schematic of an orchidometer

An orchidometer (or orchiometer) is a medical instrument used to measure the volume of the testicles.

== Instrument ==
Tanner scale for males with corresponding orchidometer bead and volume.

The orchidometer was introduced in 1966 by Swiss pediatric endocrinologist Andrea Prader of the University of Zurich. It consists of a string of twelve numbered wooden or plastic beads of increasing size from about 1 to 25 millilitres. Doctors sometimes informally refer to them as "Prader's balls", "the medical worry beads", or the "endocrine rosary".

The beads are compared with the testicles of the patient, and the volume is read off the bead which matches most closely in size. Prepubertal sizes are 1–3 ml, pubertal sizes are considered 4 ml and up and adult sizes are 15-25 ml.

The orchidometer can be used to accurately determine size of testes. Discrepancy of testicular size with other parameters of maturation can be an important clue to various diseases. Small testes can indicate either primary or secondary hypogonadism. Testicular size can help distinguish between different types of precocious puberty. Since testicular growth is typically the first physical sign of true puberty, one of the most common uses is as confirmation that puberty is beginning in a boy with delayed puberty. Large testes (macroorchidism) can be a clue to one of the most common causes of inherited generalised learning disability, fragile X syndrome.

Stephen Shalet, a leading endocrinologist who works for the Christie Hospital in Manchester, is reported to have told The Observer: "Every endocrinologist should have an orchidometer. It's his stethoscope."

Orchidometers are also commonly used to measure testicular volume of rams.

== Related concept ==
Numerous clinical scales and measurement systems exist to define genitals as normal male or female, or "abnormal", including the Prader scale, Quigley scale, and the satirical Phall-O-Meter.
