= Phall-O-Meter =

Satirical medical scale

The Phall-O-meter is a satirical measure that critiques medical standards for normal male and female phalluses. The tool was developed by Kiira Triea (Denise Tree) based on a concept by Suzanne Kessler and is used to demonstrate concerns with the medical treatment of intersex bodies.

== Schematic representation ==
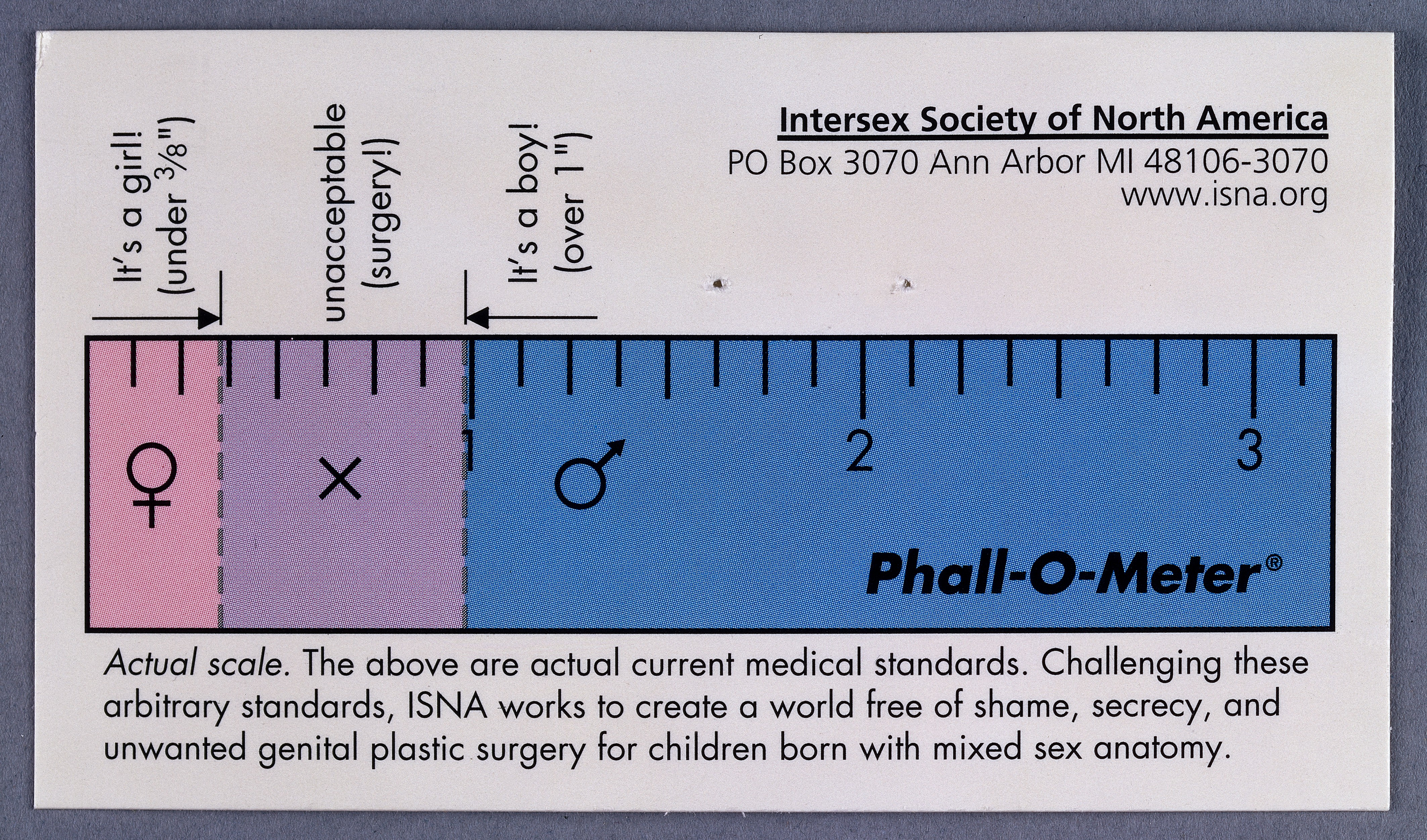

== History ==
The Phall-O-meter was developed by Kiira Triea based on a concept by professor of psychology Suzanne Kessler. Kessler summarized the range of medically acceptable infant penis and clitoris sizes in the book Lessons from the Intersexed. Kessler states that normative tables for clitoral length appeared in the late 1980s, while normative tables for penis length appeared more than forty years before that. She combined those standard tables to demonstrate an "intermediate area of phallic length that neither females nor males are permitted to have", that is, a clitoris larger than 9mm or a penis shorter than 25mm.

The meter was printed by the now-defunct Intersex Society of North America as a means of demonstrating concerns with the medical treatment of intersex people.

In her 2000 book Sexing the Body, Anne Fausto-Sterling describes how members of the intersex rights movement had developed a "phall-o-meter". Fausto-Sterling notes that, despite the existence of normative tables, clinicians' practices are more subjective: "doctors may use only their personal impressions to decide" on an appropriate clitoris size. Similarly, in a paper presented to the American Sociological Association in 2003, Sharon Preves cites Melissa Hendricks, writing in the Johns Hopkins Magazine, November 1993 on subjective clinical norms and their relationship to surgical management:

In truth, the choice of gender still often comes down to what the external genitals look like. Doctors who work with children with ambiguous genitalia sometimes put it this way, "You can make a hole [vagina] but you can't build a pole [penis]." Surgeons can decrease the size of a phallus and create a vagina, but constructing a penis that will grow as the child grows is another matter [...]

Copies of the Phall-O-Meter are now held by the Wellcome Library in London, and the Smithsonian Institution.

== Related concepts ==
While the scale as used by the Intersex Society of North America was a satirical tool for activism, numerous clinical scales and measurement systems exist to define genitals as normal male or female, or "abnormal", including the orchidometer, Prader scale and Quigley scale.

== See also ==
- Sex assignment
- Hermaphrodites with Attitude
