= Heinrich Willi =

Swiss pediatrician (1900–1971)

Heinrich Willi (4 March 1900 – 16 February 1971) was a Swiss pediatrician who specialised in neonatology and co-discovered Prader–Willi syndrome with Andrea Prader.

== Biography ==
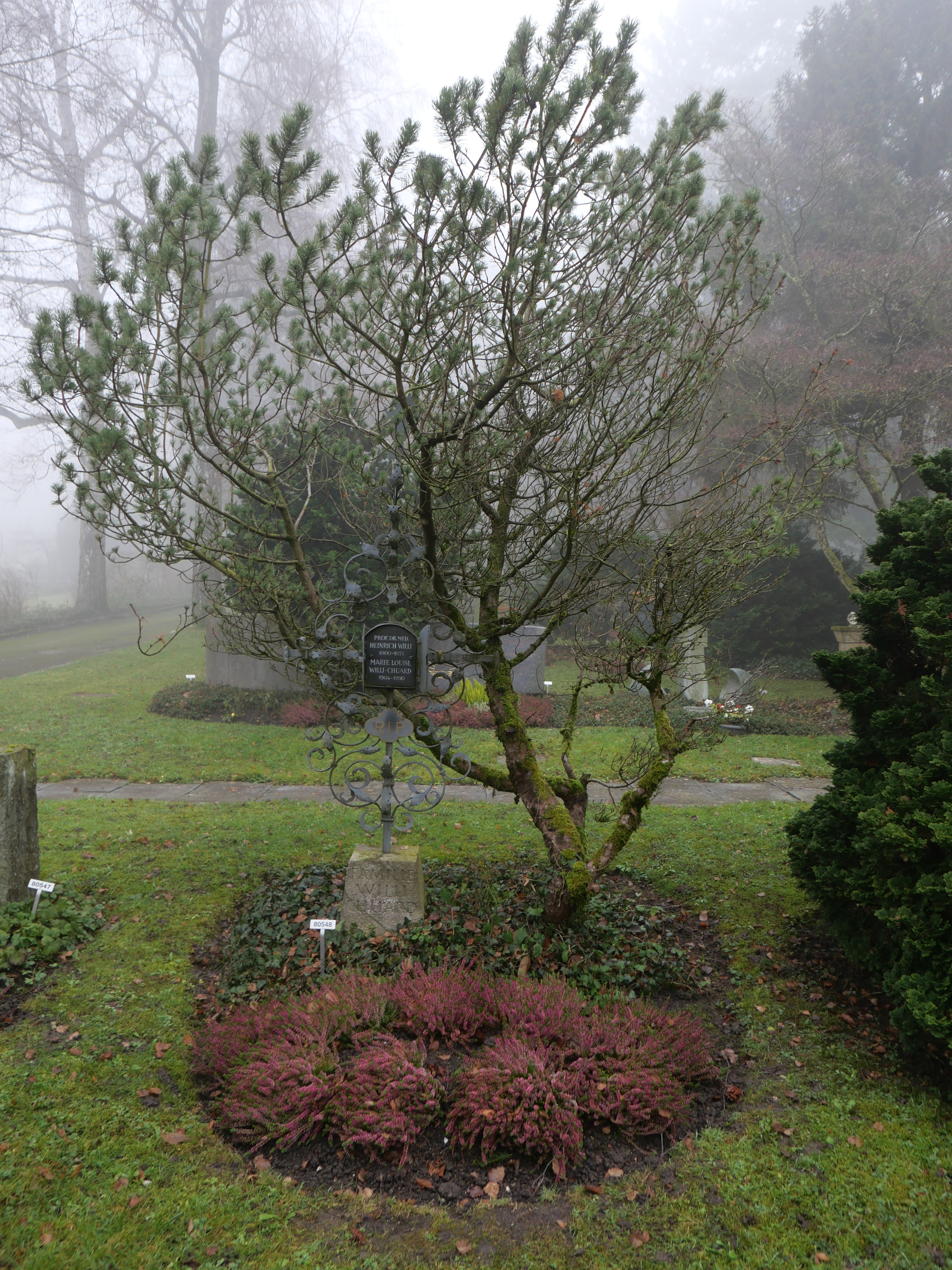
The tomb of Willi and his spouse in 2023.

Heinrich Willi was born in 1900 in Chur. He received his medical qualification from the University of Zurich in 1925 before becoming a resident at the Institute of Pathology Anatomy in Zurich and the Winterthur Hospital. He began training in pediatrics in 1928 at the Zurich Children's Hospital, under the director Guido Fanconi, and was appointed assistant medical director in 1930. He completed a doctoral thesis in 1936 on childhood leukemia and in 1937 he became the director of neonatology in what is now the University Hospital of Zürich, remaining in the position until his retirement in 1970. He served as president of the Swiss Society of Paediatrics from 1959 to 1962 and was nominated for membership of the Academy of Sciences Leopoldina.

Willi died suddenly on 16 February 1971 in Zurich, at the age of 70. He is buried at the Fluntern Cemetery in Zurich with his wife Marie Louise, née Chuard (1904-1990).

== Research ==
Willi gave his name to Prader–Willi syndrome, a genetic disorder of childhood obesity and intellectual disability that was first described by Willi, Andrea Prader and Alex Labhart in 1956. Although they presented their findings at international conferences and in a Swiss medical journal, their report did not stimulate much medical interest until the 1960s, when their observations were noted in France, the United Kingdom and the United States. Willi's other research interests included the effects of gestational diabetes on the newborn, the hematological effects of ascariasis infection, and the definitions of different childhood leukemias. He was among the first to recognise the potential for bone marrow aspiration to be used as a technique for diagnosing hematological diseases.
