= Sogto Ochirov =

Russian intersex activist

- Согто Очиров
- Born: Tsyregma Ochirova; 1993; Zabaykalsky Krai, Russia
- Occupation(s): intersex activist, archer, shepherd

Sogto Ochirov (Russian: Согто Очиров, born September 1993) is a Russian intersex activist, archer, and shepherd. He is a Buryat from Zabaykalsky Krai. He is known for speaking openly about living with partial androgen insensitivity. He became the subject of a YouTube-documentary by Elena Pogrebizhskaya "Intersex people in Russia".

== Biography ==
Ochirov was born in Zabaykalsky Krai, Russia. He was assigned female at birth based on the appearance of his genitals and named Tsyregma.

When he was 13 years old, doctors at a school medical examination sent him for additional examinations when they found out that he did not have a period. By the age of 16 in Chita, he was found to have PAIS, an intersex variation. He was sent to the capital of Russia for further medical support where he had an operation to remove his external male genital organs and was prescribed female hormones.

Due to experiencing gender dysphoria, Orichov changed his gender to male at 23 and continues to live as a man.

For religious reasons, Ochirov decided to consult with the supreme shaman Bair Tsyrendorzhiev in Ulan-Ude about which name to choose. The shaman said Ochirov must be named Sogto.

At the age of 24, he learned about the intersex community in Russia and then began to openly talk about his story in order to help other intersex people and find other intersex people in the Zabaykalsky Krai.

To people with intersex variations, Sogto says: “Accept yourself for who you are. You can't run from it, you can't hide. Just live happily!"
