= Quigley scale =

Rating scale for morphology of human genitalia

The Quigley scale is a descriptive, visual system of phenotypic grading that defines seven classes between "fully masculinized" and "fully feminized" genitalia. It was proposed by pediatric endocrinologist Charmian A. Quigley et al. in 1995. It is similar in function to the Prader scale and is used to describe genitalia in cases of androgen insensitivity syndrome, including complete androgen insensitivity syndrome, partial androgen insensitivity syndrome and mild androgen insensitivity syndrome.

== Staging ==
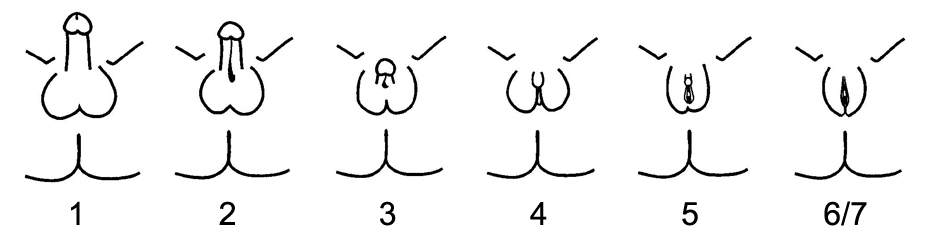
Quigley scale for androgen insensitivity syndrome

The first six grades of the scale, grades 1 through 6, are differentiated by the degree of genital masculinization. Quigley describes the scale as depicting "severity" or "defective masculinization". Grade 1 is indicated when the external genitalia is fully masculinized, and corresponds to mild androgen insensitivity syndrome. Grades 6 and 7 are indicated when the external genitalia is fully feminized, corresponding to complete androgen insensitivity syndrome.

Grades 2 through 5 quantify four degrees of decreasingly masculinized genitalia that lie in the interim. Grades 2 through 5 of the Quigley scale quantify four degrees of increasingly feminized genitalia that correspond to partial androgen insensitivity syndrome.

Grade 7 is indistinguishable from grade 6 until puberty, and is thereafter differentiated by the presence of secondary terminal hair. Grade 6 is indicated when secondary terminal hair is present, whereas grade 7 is indicated when it is absent.

== Criticism ==
While the scale has been defined as a grading system for feminized or undermasculinized genitalia, the concept that atypical genitals are necessarily pathological is contested. An opinion paper by the Swiss National Advisory Centre for Biomedical Ethics advises that "not infrequently" variations from sex norms may not be pathological or require medical treatment. Similarly, an Australian Senate Committee report on involuntary sterilization determined that research "regarding 'adequate' or 'normal' genitals, particularly for women, raises some disturbing questions", including preferences influenced by doctors' specialism and gender. In a 2015 issue paper on Human rights and intersex people, the Commissioner for Human Rights of the Council of Europe recommended a review of medical classifications that pathologise variations in sex characteristics.

== Related concepts ==
Numerous clinical scales and measurement systems exist to define genitals as normal male or female, or "abnormal", including the orchidometer, Prader scale and the satirical Phall-O-Meter.

== See also ==
- Prader scale
- Tanner scale
- Orchidometer
- Genitography
- Ambiguous genitalia
- Hypospadias
- Disorders of sex development
- Development of the reproductive system
- Sex assignment
- Intersex
