= Tony Briffa (politician) =

Australian-Maltese politician (born 1970)

Tony Briffa JP

Mayor of the City of Hobsons Bay
- In office 2011 – October 2012
- Deputy: John Hogg
- Preceded by: Michael Raffoul
- Succeeded by: Angela Altair
- In office 2022–2023
- Deputy: Diana Grima
- Preceded by: Peter Hemphill
- Succeeded by: Matt Tyler

Deputy Mayor of the City of Hobsons Bay
- In office 2009–2011
- Preceded by: Angela Altair
- Succeeded by: John Hogg
- In office 2017–2018
- Preceded by: Colleen Gates
- Succeeded by: Michael Grech

Councillor on Hobsons Bay City Council for Altona Ward
- In office November 2008 – October 2012

Councillor on Hobsons Bay City Council for Cherry Lake Ward
- In office October 2012 – 14 March 2014
- Succeeded by: Jason Price
- In office October 2016 – October 2024
- Succeeded by: Ward abolished

Personal details
- Born: Antoinette Briffa; 1970 (age 55–56) Altona, Victoria, Australia
- Known for: First known intersex mayor, LGBTIQ human rights activist, queer person, educator and public speaker.
- Television: 60 Minutes (2000 & 2005); 7.30 Report (2013)”Queerstalia” (2023)
- Website: briffa.org

Tony Briffa JP (born 1970) is an Australian politician who is notable for being the world's first known intersex mayor and public officeholder.

Briffa has partial androgen insensitivity syndrome, and was mayor of the City of Hobsons Bay, Victoria.

Briffa was raised as a girl, then lived for a time as a man, and now chooses to live as female. Briffa is one of the first people to be public about her experience of being mistreated by doctors as a result of her intersex variation, and about intersex human rights.

== Early life ==
Tony Briffa was born in Altona, Victoria, with partial androgen insensitivity syndrome. Her parents are Maltese immigrants. In an article on SBS News, Briffa explained that she had her first surgeries when she was a baby and had further procedures including the removal of healthy gonads. She also explains that she was born with a "female" body.

Speaking to a 2013 Australian Senate inquiry into the Involuntary or coerced sterilisation of intersex people in Australia, Briffa describes how doctors "convinced my mother to approve me to be castrated" (i.e. the removal of her internal testes without her consent):

"I have a few pages here from my medical records...It says: 'Mother now ready for gonadectomy.' ... The histology reports, which I will also tender, show that they were healthy testes. But there was no Family Court approval. If we are talking about coercion, doctors coerce families, parents, into believing by saying: 'We need to remove these testes because it will make your child normal'... Of course, part of the whole sterilisation thing is that you have pretty big surgery and scars, so they are making you different! ... [and surgery is] usually over the summer holidays, so your summers are spent in hospital".

== Career ==
Briffa has worked in positions with the Department of Defence and the Australian Federal Police. She is the world's first openly intersex public mayor, and "the first known intersex public office-bearer in the Western world", serving as Deputy Mayor of the City of Hobsons Bay, Victoria, between 2009 and 2011, and Mayor between 2011 and 2012. She resigned as a local councillor on 14 February 2014, effective on the appointment of a successor. In October 2016, She was re-elected to Hobsons Bay City Council.

Briffa has previously served as the President of the Genetic Support Network of Victoria, Board Member and Secretary of ILGA World, Co-executive director of InterAction for Health and Human Rights (formerly OII Australia) and long term President of Intersex Peer Support Australia (formerly the Androgen Insensitivity Syndrome Support Group Australia;. She fostered several children, is a member of numerous Victorian Government Ministerial Advisory Committees since 2001, and a current member of the Victorian Government LGBTIQ Taskforce. She is also the co-chair of the Victorian Government's Intersex Expert Advisory Group.

Briffa is running as an independent candidate for Williamstown at the 2026 Victorian state election.

=== Selected bibliography ===
- Briffa, Tony (8 September 2014). "Proud intersex person Tony Briffa tells story of self discovery". News Corp Australia. Archived from the original on 30 December 2014.
- Briffa, Tony (15 May 2014). "Tony Briffa speaks at the Darwin Outgames Human Rights Forum". Archived from the original on 16 July 2014.
- Briffa, Tony (8 May 2014), Tony Briffa writes on "Disorders of Sex Development"
- Briffa, Tony (15 April 2004). "Intersex surgery disregards children's human rights". Nature. 428 (6984): 695. Bibcode:2004Natur.428Q.695B. doi:10.1038/428695a. PMID 15085107.
- Parts of Briffa's life story are depicted in a short online animation.

== Personal life ==
=== Birth certificate ===
Briffa's original and current birth certificate recognises her sex as female, but she had previously obtained a birth certificate with a blank sex classification. Speaking to the Senate hearing on intersex sterilisation in March 2013, Briffa said:

My birth certificate, from the state of Victoria, does not classify me as male or female. I have certainly had a female birth certificate, I had a male birth certificate at one stage and I have a blank birth certificate now. But we are hoping that one day in the future our birth certificates will actually be able to reflect, for those who want it, the way nature made us. If people feel female that is great, and if they feel male that is great, but there are also people like me: I just accept the way nature made me. I am happy for my birth certificate to say that I am both male and female. One day, hopefully, we will have that as well.

=== Identity ===
Briffa made the following statement: "I am very public about being born biologically partially female and partially male and that I was raised as a girl and lived as a woman until I was 30. I ask all my friends and colleagues to respect my sex as what nature made me; both female and male". On her website, Briffa posted:

“I feel very comfortable having accepted my true nature. I am not male or female, but both. I am grateful for the years I lived as a woman and the insight and experiences it gave me. I am still ‘Antoinette’ and have now also incorporated and accepted my male (‘Anthony’ or ‘Tony’) side. I feel whole. I’ll continue to live as Tony but I feel I am now at a point in my life where I can celebrate being different.”

=== Marriage ===
Legal issues presented by Briffa's non-specific birth certificate meant that she could not lawfully marry in Australia until late 2017. On 27 September 2013, Tony Briffa married Manja Sommeling in Dunedin, New Zealand. Intersex Human Rights Australia notes:

Tony was born in Victoria with Partial Androgen Insensitivity Syndrome (PAIS), one of many intersex variations, and Tony's birth certificate does not state a sex. Marriage in Australia is currently only permissible between a man and a woman, and Tony is not eligible. Tony is able to marry in New Zealand because legislation providing marriage equality was passed earlier this year. Tony has had to declare an "indeterminate" gender for the purposes of today's marriage.

== Recognition ==
In February 2026, Briffa was recognised for her role in the passing of legislative protections for intersex people in medical settings in debates in Victoria.

== See also ==
- Betsy Driver – American politician and intersex activist (born 1964)
