= Mild androgen insensitivity syndrome =

- Other names: Undervirilized male syndrome
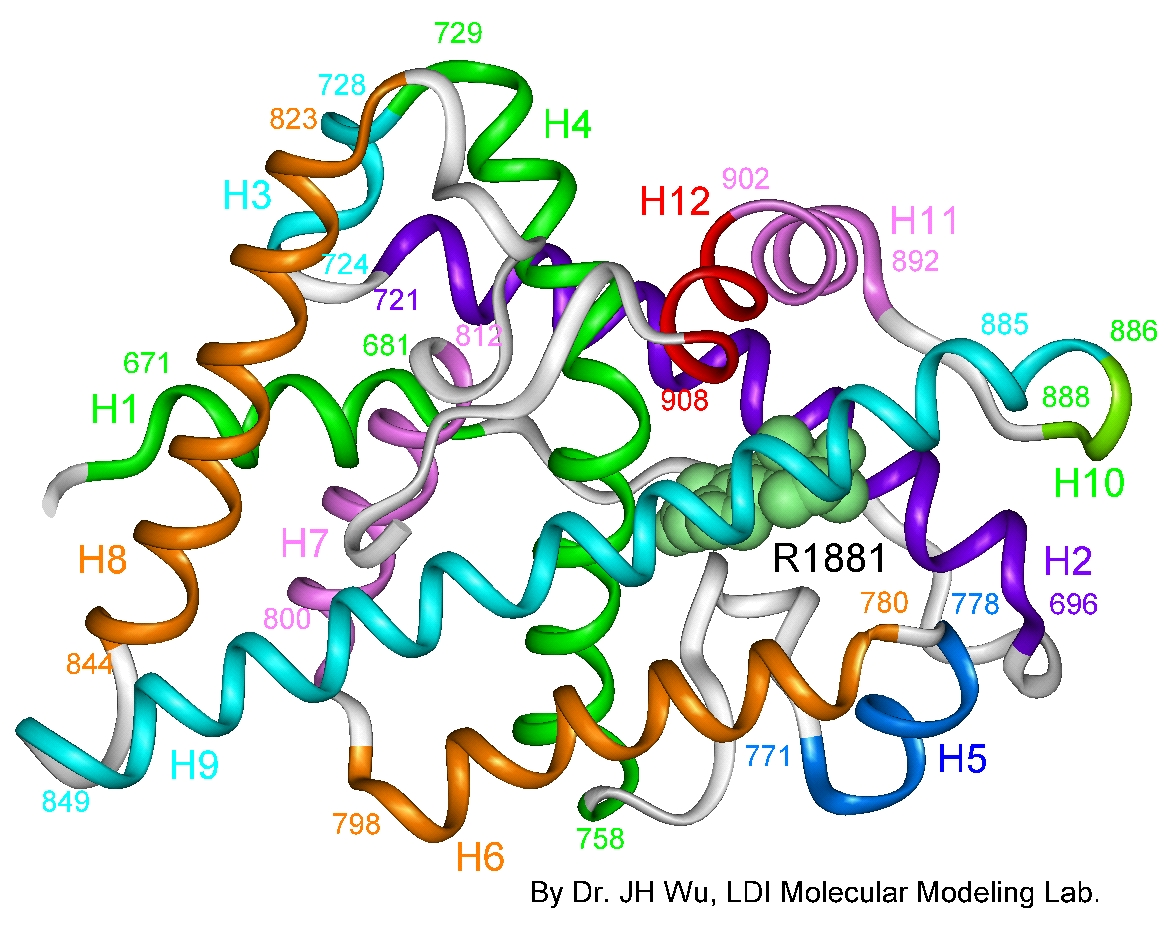
- AIS results when the function of the androgen receptor (AR) is impaired. The AR protein (pictured) mediates the effects of androgens in the human body.
- Specialty: Endocrinology

Mild androgen insensitivity syndrome (MAIS) is a medical condition that results in a mild impairment of the cell's ability to respond to androgens. The degree of impairment is sufficient to impair spermatogenesis and / or the development of secondary sexual characteristics at puberty in males, but does not affect genital differentiation or development. Female genital and sexual development is not significantly affected by the insensitivity to androgens; as such, MAIS is only diagnosed in males. The clinical phenotype associated with MAIS is a normal male habitus with mild spermatogenic defect and / or reduced secondary terminal hair.

MAIS is one of three types of androgen insensitivity syndrome, which is divided into three categories that are differentiated by the degree of genital masculinization: complete androgen insensitivity syndrome (CAIS) is indicated when the external genitalia is phenotypically female, mild androgen insensitivity syndrome (MAIS) is indicated when the external genitalia is phenotypically male, and partial androgen insensitivity syndrome (PAIS) is indicated when the external genitalia is partially, but not fully masculinized.

Androgen insensitivity syndrome is the largest single entity that leads to 46,XY undermasculinization.

== Signs and symptoms ==
Mild androgen insensitivity syndrome (MAIS) presenting with a mild impairment of virilization in a 23-year-old man.

Individuals with mild (or minimal) androgen insensitivity syndrome (grade 1 on the Quigley scale) are born phenotypically male, with fully masculinized genitalia; this category of androgen insensitivity is diagnosed when the degree of androgen insensitivity in an individual with a 46,XY karyotype is great enough to impair virilization or spermatogenesis, but is not great enough to impair normal male genital development. MAIS is the mildest and least known form of androgen insensitivity syndrome.

The existence of a variant of androgen insensitivity that solely affected spermatogenesis was theoretical at first. Cases of phenotypically normal males with isolated spermatogenic defect due to AR mutation were first detected as the result of male infertility evaluations. Until then, early evidence in support of the existence of MAIS was limited to cases involving a mild defect in virilization, although some of these early cases made allowances for some degree of impairment of genital masculinization, such as hypospadias or micropenis. It is estimated that 2-3% of infertile men have AR gene mutations. It is also estimated that MAIS is responsible for 40% of male infertility.

Examples of MAIS phenotypes include isolated infertility (oligospermia or azoospermia), mild gynecomastia in young adulthood, decreased secondary terminal hair, high pitched voice, or minor hypospadias repair in childhood. The external male genitalia (penis and scrotum) are otherwise normal in individuals with MAIS. Internal genitalia, including Wolffian structures (the epididymides, vasa deferentia, and seminal vesicles) and the prostate, is also normal, although the bitesticular volume of infertile men (both with and without MAIS) is diminished; male infertility is associated with reduced bitesticular volume, varicocele, retractile testes, low ejaculate volume, male accessory gland infections (MAGI), and mumps orchitis. The incidence of these features in infertile men with MAIS is similar to that of infertile men without MAIS. MAIS is not associated with Müllerian remnants.

=== Spinal and bulbar muscular atrophy ===
Spinal and bulbar muscular atrophy (SBMA), also known as Kennedy's disease, is a severe neurodegenerative syndrome that is associated with a particular mutation of the androgen receptor's polyglutamine tract called a trinucleotide repeat expansion. SBMA results when the length of the polyglutamine tract exceeds 40 repetitions.

Although technically a variant of MAIS, SBMA's presentation is not typical of androgen insensitivity; symptoms do not occur until adulthood and include neuromuscular defects as well as signs of androgen inaction. Neuromuscular symptoms include progressive proximal muscle weakness, atrophy, and fasciculations. Symptoms of androgen insensitivity experienced by men with SBMA are also progressive and include testicular atrophy, severe oligospermia or azoospermia, gynecomastia, and feminized skin changes despite elevated androgen levels. Disease onset, which usually affects the proximal musculature first, occurs in the third to fifth decades of life, and is often preceded by muscular cramps on exertion, tremor of the hands, and elevated muscle creatine kinase. SBMA is often misdiagnosed as amyotrophic lateral sclerosis (ALS) (also known as Lou Gehrig's disease).

The symptoms of SBMA are thought to be brought about by two simultaneous pathways involving the toxic misfolding of proteins and loss of AR functionality. The polyglutamine tract in affected pedigrees tends to increase in length over generations, a phenomenon known as "anticipation", leading to an increase in the severity of the disease as well as a decrease in the age of onset for each subsequent generation of a family affected by SBMA.

=== Comorbidity ===
Histopathology of testicular tissue showing immature germ cells and spermatogonia with decreased tubular diameter. Scattered groups of Leydig cells appearing immature.

All forms of androgen insensitivity are associated with infertility, though exceptions have been reported for both the mild and partial forms. Lifespan is not thought to be affected by AIS.

== Trinucleotide satellite lengths and AR transcriptional activity ==
The androgen receptor gene contains two polymorphic trinucleotide microsatellites in exon 1. The first microsatellite (nearest the 5' end) contains 8 to 60 repetitions of the glutamine codon "CAG" and is thus known as the polyglutamine tract. The second microsatellite contains 4 to 31 repetitions of the glycine codon "GGC" and is known as the polyglycine tract. The average number of repetitions varies by ethnicity, with Caucasians exhibiting an average of 21 CAG repeats, and Blacks 18. Disease states are associated with extremes in polyglutamine tract length; prostate cancer, hepatocellular carcinoma, and intellectual disabilities are associated with too few repetitions, while spinal and bulbar muscular atrophy (SBMA) is associated with a CAG repetition length of 40 or more. Some studies indicate that the length of the polyglutamine tract is inversely correlated with transcriptional activity in the AR protein, and that longer polyglutamine tracts may be associated with infertility and undermasculinized genitalia. However, other studies have indicated that no such correlation exists. A comprehensive meta-analysis of the subject published in 2007 supports the existence of the correlation, and concluded that these discrepancies could be resolved when sample size and study design are taken into account. Longer polyglycine tract lengths have also been associated with genital masculinization defects in some, but not all, studies.

== Diagnosis ==
MAIS is only diagnosed in normal phenotypic males, and is not typically investigated except in cases of male infertility. MAIS has a mild presentation that often goes unnoticed and untreated; even with semenological, clinical and laboratory data, it can be difficult to distinguish between men with and without MAIS, and thus a diagnosis of MAIS is not usually made without confirmation of an AR gene mutation. The androgen sensitivity index (ASI), defined as the product of luteinizing hormone (LH) and testosterone (T), is frequently raised in individuals with all forms of AIS, including MAIS, although many individuals with MAIS have an ASI in the normal range. Testosterone levels may be elevated despite normal levels of luteinizing hormone. Conversion of testosterone (T) to dihydrotestosterone (DHT) may be impaired, although to a lesser extent than is seen in 5α-reductase deficiency. A high ASI in a normal phenotypic male, especially when combined with azoospermia or oligospermia, decreased secondary terminal hair, and/or impaired conversion of T to DHT, can be indicative of MAIS, and may warrant genetic testing.

== Management ==
Due to its mild presentation, MAIS often goes unnoticed and untreated. Management of MAIS is currently limited to symptomatic management; methods to correct a malfunctioning androgen receptor protein that result from an AR gene mutation are not currently available. Treatment includes surgical correction of mild gynecomastia, minor hypospadias repair, and testosterone supplementation. Supraphysiological doses of testosterone have been shown to correct diminished secondary sexual characteristics in men with MAIS, as well as to reverse infertility due to low sperm count. As is the case with PAIS, men with MAIS will experience side effects from androgen therapy (such as the suppression of the hypothalamic-pituitary-gonadal axis) at a higher dosage than unaffected men. Careful monitoring is required to ensure the safety and efficacy of treatment. Regular breast and prostate examinations may be necessary due to comorbid association with breast and prostate cancers.
