= Andrea Prader =

Swiss scientist (1919–2001)

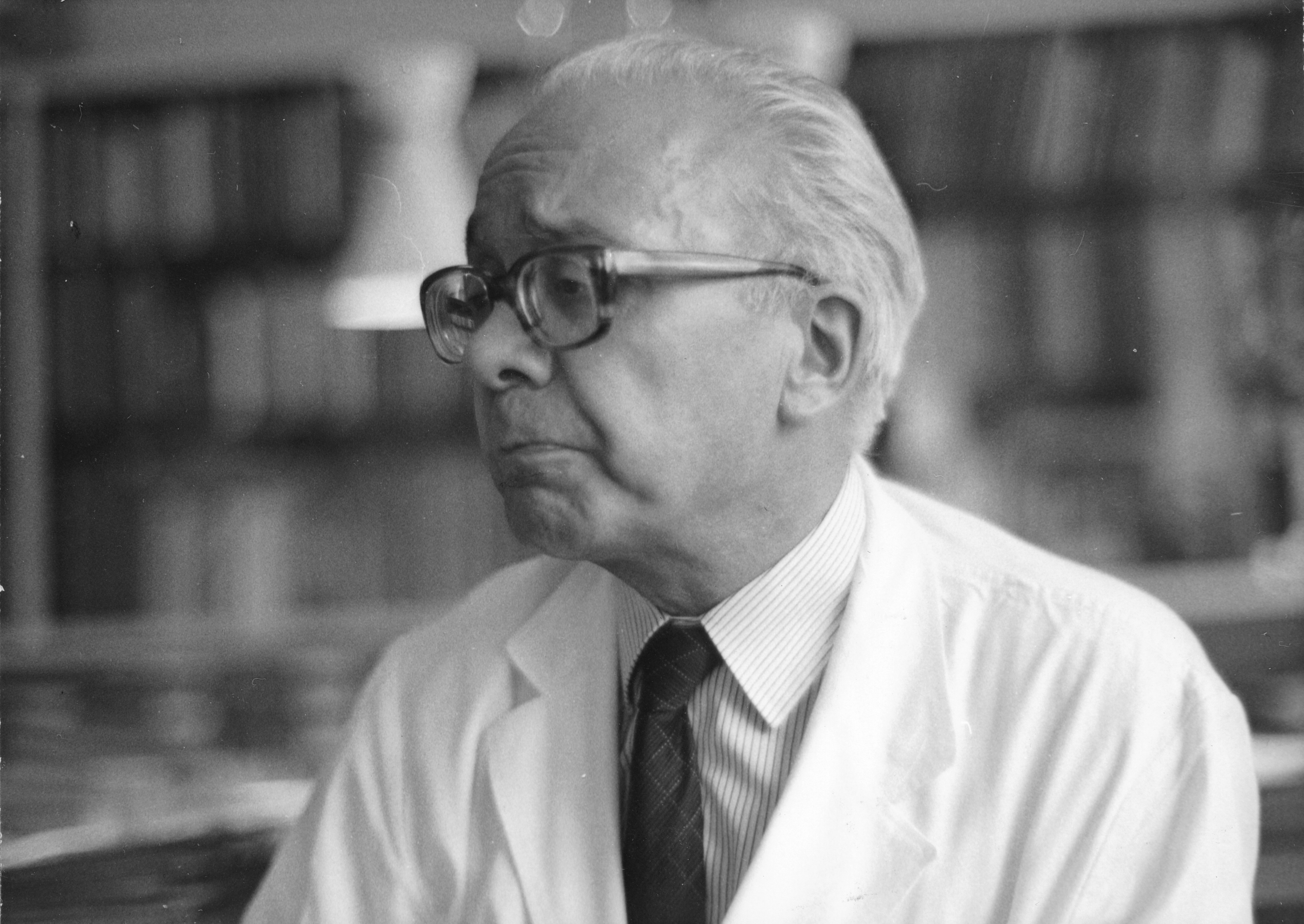
- Born: 23 December 1919; Samedan, Grisons
- Died: 3 June 2001 (aged 81); Zurich
- Education: University of Zurich
- Occupation: pediatric endocrinologist
- Years active: 1944–1986
- Employer(s): Children's Hospital Zurich (Kinderspital, Zürich)
- Known for: Prader–Willi syndrome; Andrea Prader Prize of European Society of Pediatric Endocrinologists

Andrea Prader (23 December 1919 – 3 June 2001) was a Swiss scientist, physician, and pediatric endocrinologist. He co-discovered Prader–Willi syndrome and created two physiological sex development scales, the Prader scale and the orchidometer.

== Biography ==
Andrea Prader was born in Samedan (Canton of Grisons - Country of Switzerland but lived in Zurich most of his life. He attended medical school at the University of Zurich. During his residency between 1944 and 1946, he worked under Gian Töndury in the Department of Anatomy in Zurich, and then in 1947 in the Department of Outpatient Medicine in Lausanne under Alfredo Vannotti. In 1947, he became assistant physician at the Children's Hospital in Zürich. In 1950 was the beginning of his career as pediatric endocrinologist. His advanced research brought him to the U.S. in the early 1950s; Prader specialized at the Bellevue Hospital, New York City under the guidance of L.E. Holt, Jr, son of Luther Emmett Holt. His lasting interests in endocrinology was attributed to his contacts with Lawson Wilkins. Prader received his doctorate in 1957. In 1962, he became a professor at the Medical faculty at the Zurich University. In 1965, the long-term department chief Guido Fanconi retired and Prader succeeded him as professor and chairman of the Department of Pediatrics at the University of Zürich. He also took over the post of Director of the Children's Hospital (Kinderspital) and remained in these posts until 1986.

== Studies ==
Andrea Prader's fundamental studies were in pediatric endocrinology; however, in his earlier works, there are other topics in the field of paediatrics. Here are some of his works and collaborations listed in chronological order:

- pediatric cardiology, with Ettore Rossi (1948)
- endocrine and metabolic disorders
- medical genetics (1951)
- pathophysiology of steroid hormones – including intersex-conditions and defects of the steroid synthesis (1953). He also devised the eponymous Prader scale, used to describe genital virilization.
- Prader-Gurtner syndrome, with HP Gurtner (1955)
- Prader-Labhart-Willi syndrome, with Heinrich Willi and Alex Labhart (1956)

Prader has been involved in the discovery or description of:

- lipoid congenital adrenal hyperplasia, with RE Siebenmann (1957)
- hereditary fructose intolerance, with R. Froesh, A. Labhart et al. (1957)
- pseudo-vitamin D deficiency with R. Illig et al. (1961)
- Adrenoleukodystrophy, (ALD). In 1963, Andrea Prader participated in a research effort of a collective of scientists headed by Guido Fanconi that studied and described a condition related to chronic adrenal insufficiency combined with demyelinating disease of the brain and peripheral nervous system. They came up with diagnostic criteria, pathology and clinical picture of this heritable syndrome, described first by Siemerling and Creutzfeldt in a publication in 1923 of a clinical case they had encountered and the team named it originally after Thomas Addison and Paul Ferdinand Schilder (Addison-Schilder's disease). Today the eponymous title recognizes the physicians who first described it (Siemerling and Creutzfeldt). The public became familiar with one case of the disease in the movie "Lorenzo's oil". This is a primarily pediatric progressive metabolic disorder, demonstrating most commonly in boys between the ages of 5 and 15 and combining the characteristics of Addison's disease and diffuse myelinoclastic sclerosis (Schilder's disease). Females are not affected by the condition; however, due to linkage of heredity with the X chromosome, they are thought to be genetic carriers.

== International acclaim ==
Between 1972 and 1974 he was member of honor and president of the Swiss Pediatric Society (Schweizerische Gesellschaft für Pädiatrie); he also held honorary memberships in the German Academy of Sciences Leopoldina (1968). He was Fellow of the Royal College of Physicians, London, received the Medal of the University of Helsinki, the Medal of the University of Turku, the Otto Naegeli Award, the Berthold medal of the German Society of Endocrinology, and was Doctor Honoris Causa of the Tokushima University, Japan. In 1962 and 1971, he was president of the European Society for Paediatric Endocrinology.

== The Andrea Prader Prize ==
The Andrea Prader Prize is an annual Leadership Award, established in 1987 and given to a member of the European Society for Pediatric Endocrinology in recognition of their achievements in the field of pediatric endocrinology. At the establishment of the prize, funds were provided by the Pharmacia & Upjohn, Stockholm. Currently the award is funded by Pfizer, USA.
