= Prader scale =

Rating system for the degree of virilization of human genitalia

The Prader scale or Prader staging, named after Andrea Prader, is a coarse rating system for the measurement of the degree of virilization of the genitalia of the human body and is similar to the Quigley scale. It primarily relates to virilization of the female genitalia in cases of congenital adrenal hyperplasia (CAH) or other causes of disorders of sex development (DSD) and identifies five distinct stages, but in recent times has been used to describe the range of differentiation of genitalia, with normal infant presentation being shown on either end of the scale, female on the left (0) and male on the right (6).

== Staging ==
- An infant rated at Stage 0 would be considered as having a normal vulva.
- In Stage 1, the vulva has a mildly large clitoris (clitoromegaly) and slightly reduced vaginal opening size. This degree may go unnoticed or may be simply assumed to be within normal variation.
- For Stage 2, genitalia are obviously abnormal to the eye, with a phallus intermediate in size and a small vaginal opening with separate urethral opening. Posterior labial fusion will be present.
- Stage 3 shows a further enlarged phallus, with a single urogenital sinus and almost complete fusion of the labia.
- Stage 4 looks more male than female, with an empty scrotum and a phallus the size of a normal penis, but not quite free enough of the perineum to be pulled onto the abdomen toward the umbilicus (i.e., what is termed a chordee in a male). The single small urethral/vaginal opening at the base or on the shaft of the phallus would be considered a hypospadias in a male. X-rays taken after dye injection into this opening reveal the internal connection with the upper vagina and uterus. This common opening can predispose to urinary obstruction and infection.
- Stage 5 denotes complete male virilization, with a normally formed penis with the urethral opening at or near the tip. The scrotum is normally formed but empty. The internal pelvic organs include normal ovaries and uterus, and the vagina connects internally with the urethra as in Stage 4. These infants are not visibly ambiguous are usually assumed to be ordinary boys with undescended testicles. In most cases, the diagnosis of CAH is not suspected until signs of salt-wasting develop a week later.
- Stage 6 indicates a normal penis and scrotum, with no hypospadias present and normal testicles.

== Contemporary Perspective ==
While the scale has been defined as a grading system for feminized or undermasculinized genitalia, the concept that atypical genitals are necessarily pathological is contested. An opinion paper by the Swiss National Advisory Centre for Biomedical Ethics advises that "not infrequently" variations from sex norms may not be pathological or require medical treatment. Similarly, an Australian Senate Committee report on involuntary sterilization determined that research "regarding 'adequate' or 'normal' genitals, particularly for women, raises some disturbing questions", including preferences influenced by doctors' specialism and gender. In a 2015 issue paper on Human rights and intersex people, the Commissioner for Human Rights of the Council of Europe recommended a review of medical classifications that pathologise variations in sex characteristics.

Due to its usefulness in establishing a common language around disorders of sex development, it is widely used by endocrinologists, including in the New England Journal of Medicine, the official clinical practice guidelines for the UK society of endocrinologists, and in Lancet articles published by European endocrinologists.

Research has also found a very high correlation between Prader score and an individual's gender identity.

== See also ==
- Quigley scale
- Ferriman-Gallwey score
- Tanner scale
- Clitoromegaly
- Persistent urogenital sinus
- Disorders of sex development
- Development of the reproductive system
- Intersex
- Sex assignment
