= Gonadectomy =

Surgical removal of the gonads

Gonadectomy, the removal of the gonads, may refer to:

- Orchiectomy, removal of the testicles
- Castration, removal of the use of the testicles, including by chemical means
- Oophorectomy, removal of the ovaries
