= Chordee =

Downward or upward curving of the penis head from the shaft

- An intact human penis with chordee
- Pronunciation: /ˈkɔːrdiː/
- Specialty: Urology

Chordee is a condition in which the head of the penis curves downward or upward, at the junction of the head and shaft of the penis. The curvature is usually most obvious during erection, but resistance to straightening is often apparent in the flaccid state as well. In many cases but not all, chordee is associated with hypospadias. This is not the same condition as Peyronie's disease, which involves curvature of the shaft of the penis most commonly due to injury during adult life.

== Signs and symptoms ==
It is usually considered a congenital malformation of unknown cause. Since at an early stage of fetal development the penis is curved downward, it has been proposed that chordee results from an arrest of penile development at that stage.

The curvature of a chordee can involve

1. tethering of the skin with urethra and corpora of normal size;
2. curvature induced by fibrosis and contracture of the fascial tissue (Buck's fascia or dartos) surrounding the urethra;
3. disproportionately large corpora in relation to the urethral length without other demonstrable abnormality of either; or
4. a short, fibrotic urethra that tethers the penis downward (the least common type).

Severe degrees of chordee are usually associated with hypospadias, but mild degrees of curvature may occur in many otherwise normal males. When the curved penis is small and accompanied by hypospadias, deficiency of prenatal androgen effect can be inferred.

== Cause ==
A chordee may be caused by an underlying condition, such as a disorder of sex development or an intersex condition, or from a complication of circumcision, though some medical professionals do not consider it to be true chordee because the corporal bodies are normally formed. However, not all congenital chordee includes abnormal corpora, and case reports of damage to the corpus cavernosum from circumcision are noted in the literature; particularly as a complication of local anesthetic.

== Treatment ==
The principal treatment of chordee is surgery in infancy, usually by a pediatric urologist. With chordees caused by circumcision, the preferred method of surgical treatment is a z-plasty. The preferred time for surgery is between the ages of 6 and 18 months and correction is usually successful.
