= Genitoplasty =

Plastic surgery performed on the genitals

- ICD-9-CM: 70.64, 70.62, 70.64, 70.94, 70.6, 70.95
- MeSH: D013509

Genitoplasty is plastic surgery to the genitals. Genitoplasties may be reconstructive to repair injuries, and damage arising from cancer treatment, or congenital disorders, endocrine conditions, or they may be cosmetic.

== Medical uses ==
Genitoplasty surgery includes the following:

- Vaginoplasty
- Correction of congenital conditions
  - congenital adrenal hyperplasia
  - microphallus repair
  - hypospadias repair
  - pseudovaginal perineoscrotal hypospadias repair
  - androgen insensitivity syndrome repair
  - repair of a urethra that is short
- labiaplasty
- vaginal construction
- vaginal reconstruction
- repair of vaginal vault prolapse
- vaginal suspension and fixation
- operations on cul-de-sac
- repair of cystocele
- repair of rectocele
- genital prolapse
- retropubic paravaginal repair
- hymenorrhaphy

The grafts used in genitalplasty can be an allogenic, an autograft, a xenograft, or an autologous material.

Genital reconstruction surgery can correct prolapse of the urinary bladder into the vagina and protrusion of the rectum into the vagina. Female infants born with a 46,XX genotype but have genitalia affected by congenital adrenal hyperplasia may undergo the surgical creation of a vagina. Vaginoplasty is commonly used to treat women with the congenital absence of the vagina. Other reasons for the surgery are to treat adrenal hyperplasia, microphallus, Mayer-Rokitansky-Kustner disorder and for women who have had a vaginectomy after malignancy or trauma. Reconstructive and corrective vaginal surgery restores or creates the vagina.

Surgeries to modify the cosmetic appearance of infants' and children's genitals are controversial due to their human rights implications. There is no clinical consensus about necessity, timing, indications or evaluation.

== See also ==
- Intersex medical interventions
