= Labial fusion =

- Other names: Labial fusion, labial adhesion, labial synechiae, labial agglutination, labial adherence, gynatresia, vulvar fusion, and vulvar synechiae.
- Specialty: Medical genetics

Labial fusion is a medical condition of the vulva where the labia minora become fused together. It is generally a pediatric condition.

== Presentation ==
Labial fusion is rarely present at birth, but rather acquired later in infancy, since it is caused by insufficient estrogen exposure and newborns have been exposed to maternal estrogen in utero. It typically presents in infants at least 3 months old. Most presentations are asymptomatic and are discovered by a parent or during routine medical examination. In other cases, patients may present with associated symptoms of dysuria, urinary frequency, refusal to urinate, or post-void dribbling. Some patients present with vaginal discharge due to pooling of urine in the vulval vestibule or vagina.

=== Complications ===
Labial fusion can lead to urinary tract infection, vulvar vestibulitis and inflammation caused by chronic urine exposure. In severe cases, labial adhesions can cause complete obstruction of the urethra, leading to anuria and urinary retention.

== Pathophysiology ==
The primary contributing factor to labial fusion is low estrogen levels. A vulva with low estrogen exposure, such as that of a preadolescent, has delicate epithelial lining and is therefore vulnerable to irritation. Conditions causing irritation, such as infection, inflammation and trauma, cause the edges of the labia minora to fuse together. The fusion typically begins at the posterior frenulum of the labia minora and continues anteriorly.

Most labial adhesions resolve spontaneously before puberty as estrogen levels increase and the vaginal epithelium becomes cornified.

== Diagnosis ==
The condition can be diagnosed based on inspection of the vulva. In patients with labial fusion, a flat plane of tissue with a dense central line of tissue is usually seen when the labia majora are retracted, while an anterior opening is usually present below the clitoris.

== Treatment ==
Treatment is not usually necessary in asymptomatic cases, since most fusions will separate naturally over time, but may be required when symptoms are present. The standard method of treatment for labial fusion is the application of topical estrogen cream onto the areas of adhesion, which is effective in 90% of patients. In severe cases where the labia minora are entirely fused, causing urinary outflow obstruction or vaginal obstruction, the labia should be separated surgically. Recurrence after treatment is common but is thought to be prevented by good hygiene practices. One study has shown that betamethasone may be more effective than estrogen cream in preventing recurrence, with fewer side effects.

== Epidemiology ==
Labial fusion is not uncommon in infants and young girls. It is most common in infants between the ages of 13 and 23 months, and has an incidence of 3.3% in this age group. It is estimated that labial fusion occurs in 1.8% of all prepubertal girls. It is rare in adult women, particularly in reproductive age, but is occasionally found in postpartum and postmenopausal women.
