= Sex characteristics (legal term) =

Legal term

In law, sex characteristic refers to an attribute defined for the purposes of protecting individuals from discrimination due to their sexual features. The attribute of sex characteristics was first defined in national law in Malta in 2015. The legal term has since been adopted by United Nations, European, and Asia-Pacific institutions, and in a 2017 update to the Yogyakarta Principles on the application of international human rights law in relation to sexual orientation, gender identity, gender expression and sex characteristics.

== Physical attributes ==
Physical sex characteristics include primary sex characteristics and secondary sex characteristics. A primary sexual characteristic, as narrowly defined, is any anatomical part of the body involved in sexual reproduction and constituting the reproductive system in a complex organism, especially the external sex organs; the external sex organs are also commonly referred to as the genitalia or genitals. Secondary sex characteristics are features that appear at sexual development / sexual maturity in any animal species (including humans), especially the sexually dimorphic phenotypic traits that distinguish the sexes of a species, but that, unlike the sex organs, are not directly part of the reproductive system.

== Legal attribute ==
Explicit protection on grounds of sex characteristics Explicit protection on grounds of intersex status Explicit protection on grounds of intersex within attribute of sex

Sex characteristics is a term used in law and in human rights frameworks. The term was first used in Malta in 2015, when the country enacted legal protections from discrimination and forced medical procedures on grounds of sex characteristics. The Gender Identity, Gender Expression and Sex Characteristics Act defined sex characteristics as:

"sex characteristics" refers to the chromosomal, gondal and anatomical features of a person, which include primary characteristics such as reproductive organs and genitalia and/or in chromosomal structures and hormones; and secondary characteristics such as muscle mass, hair distribution, breasts and/or structure.

In November 2017, the Yogyakarta Principles were expanded to include new principles and new attributes of sex characteristics and gender identity. The supplement noted that the new "explicit ground for protection from violations of human rights has evolved in international jurisprudence". Sex characteristics is defined as:

UNDERSTANDING 'sex characteristics' as each person's physical features relating to sex, including genitalia and other sexual and reproductive anatomy, chromosomes, hormones, and secondary physical features emerging from puberty.

In 2015, the Fundamental Rights Agency published a comparative legal analysis on protection against discrimination on grounds of sexual orientation, gender identity and sex characteristics in the EU.

In 2016, the Asia Pacific Forum of National Human Rights Institutions (AFP) manual on Promoting and Protecting Human Rights in relation to Sexual Orientation, Gender Identity and Sex Characteristics. The document provides an analysis of human rights issues, including the rights to physical integrity, non-discrimination, effective remedies and redress, and recognition before the law.

=== Intersex people ===
The Maltese Act that introduced the term was widely welcomed internationally by civil society organizations as it offered protections to intersex people for the first time. The Act was later followed by a report by the Commissioner for Human Rights of the Council of Europe that recognized that sex characteristics are distinct from a person's sexual orientation and gender identity.

In a wide-ranging analysis on intersex human rights and health issues, the Council of Europe published an Issue Paper entitled Human rights and intersex people in May 2015. In the Issue Paper, the Council's Commissioner for Human Rights recommended that Member States of the Council of Europe protect intersex citizens on grounds of "sex characteristics", or otherwise protect intersex persons on grounds of sex or gender:

National equal treatment and hate crime legislation should be reviewed to ensure that it protects intersex people. Sex characteristics should be included as a specific ground in equal treatment and hate crime legislation or, at least, the ground of sex/gender should be authoritatively interpreted to include sex characteristics as prohibited grounds of discrimination. (page 9)

In 2015, the United Nations published a fact sheet using the term sex characteristics to define intersex:

Intersex people are born with sex characteristics (including genitals, gonads and chromosome patterns) that do not fit typical binary notions of male or female bodies.

This was followed by a public statement by UN and regional human rights experts in 2016 utilizing a similar definition. In September 2015, Zeid Ra'ad Zeid Al-Hussein, the United Nations High Commissioner for Human Rights, opened an Expert meeting on ending human rights violations against intersex persons stating:

All human beings are born equal in dignity and rights. Those foundational, bedrock principles of universality and equality mean that all of us, without exception, and regardless of our sex characteristics, are equally entitled to the protections of international human rights law.

In 2017, Amnesty International published a report condemning "non-emergency, invasive and irreversible medical treatment with harmful effects" on children born with variations of sex characteristics in Germany and Denmark. It found that surgeries take place with limited psychosocial support, based on gender stereotypes, but without firm evidence. Amnesty International reported that "there are no binding guidelines for the treatment of intersex children".

== See also ==
- Intersex
- Intersex human rights
- Intersex human rights reports
- Malta declaration (International Intersex Forum)
- Legal recognition of intersex people
- Discrimination against intersex people
- Intersex people in history
- Intersex medical interventions
- Intersex healthcare
- Disorders of sex development
- Sex assignment
