= Intersex and LGBTQ =

Relationship between different sex and gender minorities

Intersex people are born with sex characteristics (such as genitals, gonads, and chromosome patterns) that "do not fit the typical definitions for male or female bodies". They are substantially more likely to identify as lesbian, gay, bisexual, transgender or queer (LGBTQ) than endosex people. According to a study done in Australia of Australian citizens with intersex conditions, participants labeled 'heterosexual' as the most popular single label (selected at 48%) with the rest being scattered among various other labels. According to another study, an estimated 8.5% to 20% experience gender dysphoria. Although many intersex people are heterosexual and cisgender, and not all of them identify as LGBTQ+, this overlap and "shared experiences of harm arising from dominant societal sex and gender norms" has led to intersex people often being included under the LGBTQ umbrella, with the acronym sometimes expanded to LGBTQI. (Note: Other terms are also used, see below.) Some intersex activists and organisations have criticised this inclusion as distracting from intersex-specific issues such as involuntary medical interventions.

== Intersex and homosexuality ==
Intersex can be contrasted with homosexuality or same-sex attraction. Numerous studies have shown higher rates of same sex attraction in intersex people, with a recent Australian study of people born with atypical sex characteristics finding that, while 48% labeled themselves as straight, 52% of respondents labeled themselves as various other categories besides heterosexual.

Clinical research on intersex subjects has been used to investigate means of preventing homosexuality. In 1990, Heino Meyer-Bahlburg wrote on a "prenatal hormone theory of sexual orientation." The author discussed research finding higher rates of same sex attraction among women with congenital adrenal hyperplasia, and consistent sexual attraction to men among women with complete androgen insensitivity syndrome - a population described by the author as "genetic males." Meyer-Bahlburg also discussed sexual attraction by individuals with partial androgen insensitivity syndrome, 5α-Reductase deficiency and 17β-Hydroxysteroid dehydrogenase III deficiency, stating that sexual attraction towards females in individuals with these conditions was facilitated by "prenatal exposure to and utilization of androgens." He concluded:

It is too early to conclude that there is a pre- or perinatal hormonal contribution to the development of homosexuality, except perhaps in persons with clearcut physical signs of intersexuality. The scientific basis is insufficient to justify the assessment of chromosomes and sex hormones in the fetus, or the prenatal treatment with sex hormones, for the purpose of preventing the development of homosexuality, quite apart from the ethical issues involved.

In 2010, Saroj Nimkarn and Maria New wrote that, "Gender-related behaviors, namely childhood play, peer association, career and leisure time preferences in adolescence and adulthood, maternalism, aggression, and sexual orientation become" masculinized in women with congenital adrenal hyperplasia. Medical intervention to prevent such traits has been likened by Dreger, Feder and Tamar-Mattis to a means of preventing homosexuality and "uppity women."

A poll sampled from primarily LGBTQ intersex youth in the US by The Trevor Project found that 55% identified as bisexual/pansexual, 28% gay/lesbian, 12% queer, 2% straight and 3% questioning.

=== Queer bodies ===
Intersex activists and scholars such as Morgan Holmes, Katrina Karkazis and Morgan Carpenter have identified heteronormativity in medical rationales for medical interventions on infants and children with intersex characteristics. Holmes and Carpenter have sometimes talked of intersex bodies as "queer bodies", while Carpenter also stresses inadequacies and "dangerous" consequences from framing intersex as a sexual orientation or gender identity issue.

In What Can Queer Theory Do for Intersex? Iain Morland contrasts queer "hedonic activism" with an experience of insensate post-surgical intersex bodies to claim that "queerness is characterized by the sensory interrelation of pleasure and shame."

== Intersex and transgender ==
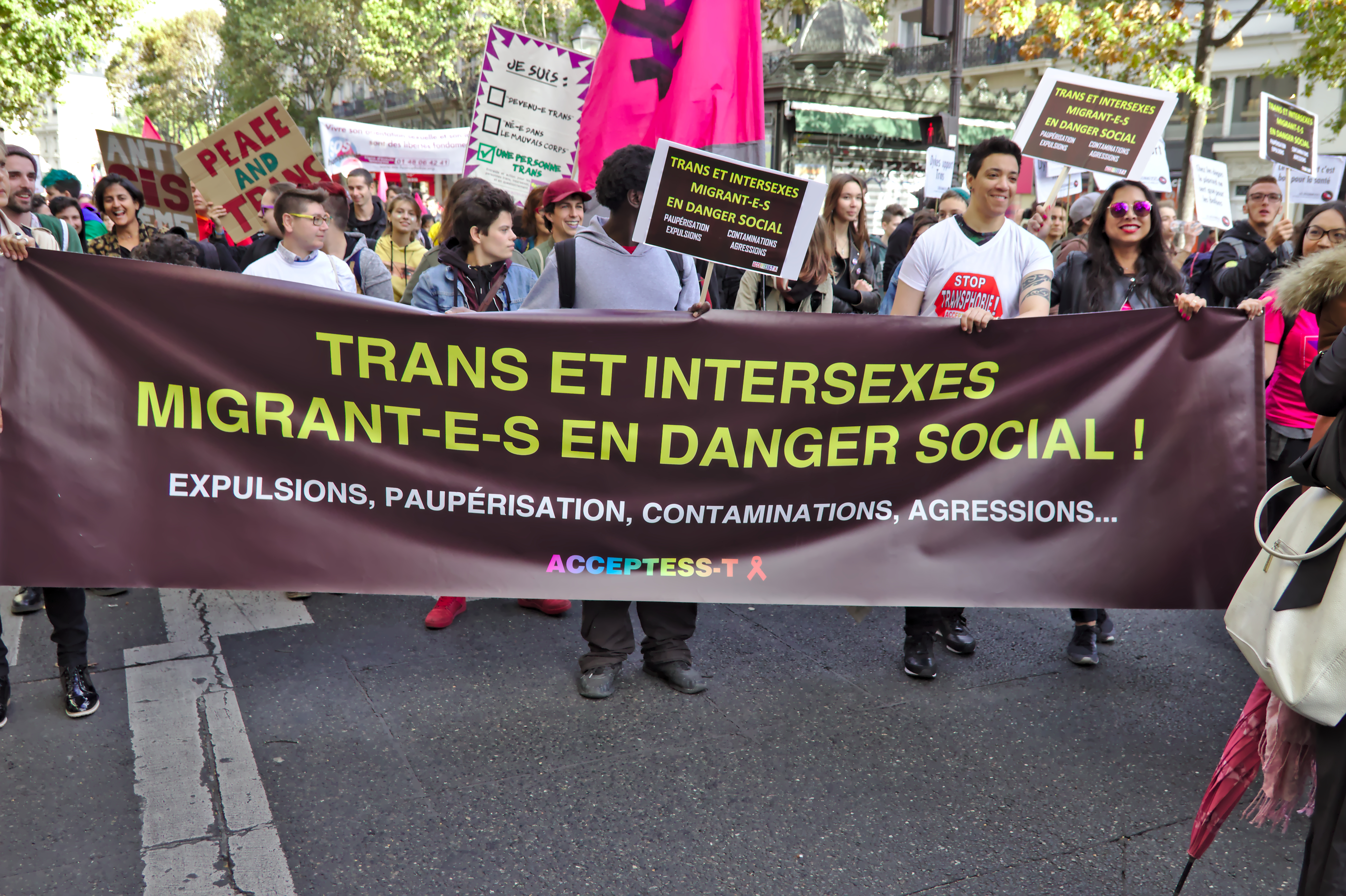
Intersex banner at trans march reading: "Trans and intersex, migrants in social danger: expulsions, impoverishment, contamination, and violence." Existrans 2017, Paris.

Intersex can also be contrasted with transgender, which describes the condition in which one's gender identity does not match one's assigned sex. Some people are both intersex and transgender. A 2012 clinical review paper reported that between 8.5% and 20% of people with intersex variations experienced gender dysphoria. A report by The Trevor Project on polling intersex youth in the US found that 42% identified as cisgender, 32% non-binary, 17% transgender, and 9% questioning, the poll sampled primarily LGBTQ youth.

=== Non-binary gender ===
Recognition of third sex or gender classifications occurs in several countries. Sociological research in Australia, a country with a third 'X' sex classification, shows that 19% of people born with atypical sex characteristics selected an "X" or "other" option, while 52% are women, 23% men, and 6% unsure.

A German law requiring that infants which can be assigned to neither sex have their status left blank on their birth certificate was criticised by intersex rights groups on the basis that it could encourage parents who see a neutral option as undesirable to have their child undergo genital surgery. In 2013, the third International Intersex Forum made statements for the first time on sex and gender registration in the Malta declaration, advocating for "register[ing] intersex children as females or males, with the awareness that, like all people, they may grow up to identify with a different sex or gender" and "ensur[ing] that sex or gender classifications are amendable through a simple administrative procedure at the request of the individuals concerned." It also advocates for non-binary options and self-identification for all while calling for an end to registering sex on birth certificates.

Alex MacFarlane is believed to be the first person in Australia to obtain a birth certificate recording sex as indeterminate, and the first Australian passport with an 'X' sex marker in 2003. On September 26, 2016, California resident Sara Kelly Keenan became the second person in the United States (after Elisa Rae Shupe) to legally change their gender to 'non-binary'. Keenan cited Shupe's case as inspiration for their petition, "It never occurred to me that this was an option, because I thought the gender change laws were strictly for transgender people. I decided to try and use the same framework to have a third gender." Keenan later obtained a birth certificate with an intersex sex marker. In press reporting of this decision, it became apparent that Ohio had issued a 'hermaphrodite' sex marker in 2012.

Intersex scholar Morgan Holmes argues that thinking of societies that incorporate a 'third sex' as superior is overly simplistic, and that "to understand whether a system is more or less oppressive than another we have to understand how it treats its various members, not only its 'thirds'."

The Asia Pacific Forum of National Human Rights Institutions states that the legal recognition of intersex people is firstly about access to the same rights as other men and women, when assigned male or female; secondly it is about access to administrative corrections to legal documents when an original sex assignment is not appropriate; and thirdly it is not about the creation of a third sex or gender classification for intersex people as a population but it is, instead, about self-determination.

== LGBTQ and LGBTQI ==
The relationship of intersex to lesbian, gay, bisexual, transgender, and queer communities is complex, but intersex people are often included in the LGBTQ community with the explicit addition as LGBTQI. A 2019 background note by the Office of the United Nations High Commissioner for Human Rights has stated that intersex persons are a distinct population with concerns about "representation, misrepresentation and resourcing", but who share "common concerns" with LGBTQ people "due to shared experiences of harm arising from dominant societal sex and gender norms." The paper identifies both how intersex people can suffer human rights violations "before they are able to develop or freely express and identity" and how "stereotypes, fear and stigmatization of LGBTQ people provide rationales for forced and coercive medical interventions on children with intersex variations."

Julius Kaggwa of SIPD Uganda has written that, while the gay community "offers us a place of relative safety, it is also oblivious to our specific needs." Mauro Cabral has written that transgender people and organizations "need to stop approaching intersex issues as if they were trans issues" including use of intersex as a means of explaining being transgender; "we can collaborate a lot with the intersex movement by making it clear how wrong that approach is."

Pidgeon Pagonis states that adding an I to LGBTQA+ may or may not help increase representation, and may increase funding opportunities for intersex organizations, but may also be harmful to intersex children due to stigma associated with being LGBTQA+. Organisation Intersex International Australia states that many intersex people are heterosexual and many are not. They further say that most identify with the sex assigned at birth, but some do not. They also note that some intersex people that do not agree with their sex assigned at birth identify as transgender or gender diverse, "while others may see themselves as correcting a mistake made by doctors without their consent when they were children."

On July 1, 2020, Russian intersex organizations (Interseks.ru, ARSI, NFP+, Intersex Russia) issued a statement on the use of the acronym LGBTI, urging not to use it in and about countries with widespread prejudice and violence in attitudes of individuals based on their sexual orientation and gender identity.

=== Protecting intersex people in law ===
Explicit protection on grounds of sex characteristics Explicit protection on grounds of intersex status Explicit protection on grounds of intersex within attribute of sex

Emi Koyama describes how inclusion of intersex in LGBTI can fail to address intersex-specific human rights issues, including creating false impressions "that intersex people's rights are protected" by laws protecting LGBT people, and failing to acknowledge that many intersex people are not LGBT.

South Africa protects intersex people from discrimination as part of a prohibition of discrimination on grounds of sex. Organisation Intersex International Australia successfully lobbied for inclusion of a legal attribute of "intersex status" in anti-discrimination law, stating that protection on grounds of sexual orientation and gender identity was insufficient. Following 2015 legislation in Malta, an attribute of sex characteristics is now more widespread.

=== "Pinkwashing" ===
Legal prohibition of non-consensual medical interventions Regulatory suspension or limitation of harmful practices Legal prohibition in at least one state/province Physical integrity and bodily autonomy on intersex not legislated

Multiple organizations have highlighted appeals to LGBT rights recognition that fail to address the issue of unnecessary "normalising" intersex medical interventions on intersex children, including by using the portmanteau pinkwashing. In a 2001 paper for the (now defunct) Intersex Society of North America, Emi Koyama and Lisa Weasel stating that teaching of intersex issues is "stuck" at talking about intersex as a mean instead of an end:

This indeed seems to be a common problem within women's, gender and queer studies: discussions about intersex existence are "stuck" at where it is used to deconstruct sexes, gender roles, compulsory heterosexuality, and even Western science, rather than addressing medical ethics or other issues that directly impact the lives of intersex people. But perhaps this is an inaccurate way to describe the situation: the truth is not that these discussions are "stuck" prematurely, but that they are starting from a wrong place with a wrong set of priorities".

In June 2016, Organisation Intersex International Australia pointed to contradictory statements by Australian governments, suggesting that the dignity and rights of LGBT and intersex people are recognized while, at the same time, harmful practices on intersex children continue.

In August 2016, Zwischengeschlecht described actions to promote equality or civil status legislation without action on banning "intersex genital mutilations" as a form of pinkwashing. The organization has previously highlighted evasive government statements to UN Treaty Bodies that conflate intersex, transgender and LGBT issues, instead of addressing harmful practices on infants.

== Terms ==
LGBT+ is an initialism that stands for lesbian, gay, bisexual, and transgender, and others. The initialism has become mainstream as a self-designation; it has been adopted by the majority of sexuality and gender identity-based community centers and media in the United States, as well as many other countries.

Another variant is LGBTQIA, which is used, for example, by the "Lesbian, Gay, Bisexual, Transgender, Queer, Intersex, Asexual Resource Center" at the University of California, Davis.

The United States National Institutes of Health (NIH) have framed LGBT, others "whose sexual orientation and/or gender identity varies, those who may not self-identify as LGBT" and also intersex populations (as persons with disorders of sex development) as "sexual and gender minority" (SGM) populations. This has led to the development of an NIH SGM Health Research Strategic Plan.

The concept of queer can also be included to form the initialisms LGBTIQ and LGTBIQ (in Spanish).

== Other intersectionalities ==
=== Intersex and children's rights ===
Kimberly Zieselman of interACT has described how the LGBT community has helped open doors, but how intersex rights are broader: "at its core this is a children's rights issue. It is also about health and reproductive rights, because these operations can lead to infertility."

=== Intersex and disability ===
Multiple authors and civil society organizations highlight intersectionalities between intersex people and disability, due to issues of medicalization, and the use of preimplantation genetic diagnosis. In an analysis of the use of preimplantation genetic diagnosis to eliminate intersex traits, Behrmann and Ravitsky state: "Parental choice against intersex may ... conceal biases against same-sex attractedness and gender nonconformity."

A 2006 clinical reframing of intersex conditions as disorders of sex development made associations between intersex and disability explicit, but the rhetorical shift remains deeply contentious. Sociological research in Australia, published in 2016, found that 3% of respondents used the term "disorders of sex development" or "DSD" to define their sex characteristics, while 21% use the term when accessing medical services. In contrast, 60% used the term "intersex" in some form to self-describe their sex characteristics.

In the United States, intersex persons are protected by the Americans with Disabilities Act. In 2013, the Australian Senate published a report on the Involuntary or coerced sterilisation of intersex people in Australia as part of a broader inquiry into the involuntary or coercive sterilization of people with disabilities. In Europe, OII Europe has identified multiple articles of the UN Convention on the Rights of Persons with Disabilities, including on equality and non-discrimination, and freedom from torture, and protecting the integrity of the person. Nevertheless, the organization has expressed concern that framings of intersex as disability can reinforce medicalization and lack of human rights, and do not match self-identification.

== See also ==
- Asexuality and LGBTQ
