= Intersex healthcare =

Healthcare for intersex people throughout their lives

People with intersex variations, also called disorders of sex development, have hormonal, genetic, or anatomical differences unexpected of an endosex (non-intersex) male or female. These can include, but are not limited to, reproductive organs with a mix of male and female structures, underdeveloped reproductive organs, and rare sex chromosomes or chromosomes unexpected of one's sex.

The healthcare needs of intersex people differ depending on which variations they have. Some intersex variations can cause a lack of sex hormones, infertility, or an increased risk of cancer. Intersex people have a higher risk of experiencing mental health issues like depression and PTSD compared to the general population.

Healthcare for intersex people can include treatments for one's mental, cognitive, physical, and sexual health. This can include hormone replacement, peer support, medical assistance for conceiving children, and other treatments depending on the needs of the individual. Intersex conditions are diagnosed prenatally (before birth), at birth, or later in life via genetic and hormone testing as well as medical imaging.

Intersex healthcare often comes with additional challenges compared to healthcare for endosex people. This is due to stigma and medical abuse towards intersex people, lack of intersex inclusion in medical research, and lack access to supportive and specialized care. Intersex healthcare has historically focused on making intersex people fit into physical and social norms for one's sex. This includes concealing information from patients and medically unnecessary surgeries. Intersex organizations advocate to end these practices and make further changes to respect and include intersex people. The medicalization of intersex variations and the use of the term "disorders of sex development" are disputed as well.

== Presentation and diagnosis ==
Variations of sex characteristics, also called intersex or disorders in sex development, refer to people with innate genetic, hormonal, or physical sex characteristics outside of medical norms for males or females. It refers to a wide spectrum of variations to genitals, hormones, chromosomes, and/or sex characteristics." Intersex variations can result in a combination of male and female structures, such as having both a uterus and testes; atypical genital appearance, such as a closed vagina; or missing or underdeveloped reproductive organs, such as a vaginal opening with no womb. Other characteristics include the presence of micropenis, hypospadias, urethra opening into the vagina, partly fused labia, large clitoris, electrolyte imbalance, undescended testes, and masses in the labia or groin for females. Some intersex variations may result in genitals expected of one's sex, but differing chromosomes, such as having only a single X chromosome (Turner syndrome) or XXY chromosomes (Klinefelter syndrome). Up to 1.7% of the general population is estimated to be intersex. The cause of one's intersex variation is often unknown. Some intersex variations can be inherited from a child's parents; for example, congenital adrenal hyperplasia (CAH) can be inherited if both parents have a copy of the affected gene.

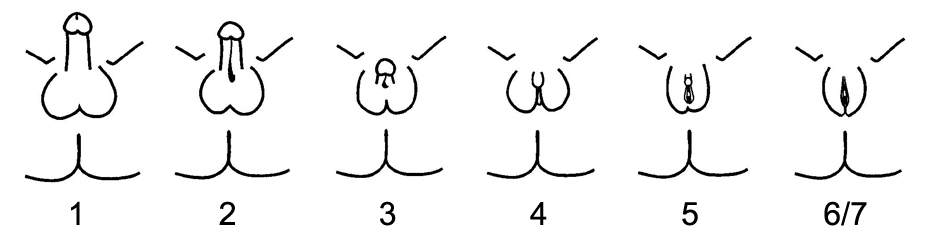
Quigley scale showing different forms of genital development in cases of androgen insensitivity syndrome

The same intersex variation can have different presentations or severity. Androgen insensitivity syndrome (AIS) has 3 forms: complete androgen insensitivity syndrome (CAIS), partial androgen insensitivity syndrome (PAIS), and mild androgen insensitivity syndrome (MAIS). CAIS makes the body unable to respond to androgens, while PAIS and MAIS lead to the body having partial sensitivity to androgens. Those with CAIS present with female genitals but no womb or ovaries and those with MAIS have male genitals but are often infertile. Those with PAIS can present with male genitals, female genitals, or ambiguous genitals.

CAH has different variants as well. 90 percent of cases take the form of 21-hydroxylase deficiency, also known as CAH 1, but there are more uncommon variations such as 11β-hydroxylase deficiency and 17α-hydroxylase deficiency depending on which gene is affected. CAH 1 can have either a classical or nonclassical presentation. Classical CAH takes the form of salt-wasting or simple virilization. Three quarters of classical CAH cases involve salt imbalance causing symptoms such as vomiting, dehydration, and low blood pressure. One quarter of classical CAH cases include simple virilization (ambiguous or male external genitals with female reproductive organs). Nonclassical CAH results in typical female genitals, but presents symptoms later in life including early puberty, irregular periods, infertility, hirsutism and hyperandrogenism (excessive male hormones).

Mayer-Rokitansky-Küster-Hauser syndrome (MRKH) has two types which can produce different presentations. Type 1 only impacts the reproductive organs causing a lack of a uterus and cervix as well as a shallow vagina. Symptoms for type 1 MRKH are noticed at adolescence or adulthood, often due to the lack of a period. Type 2 MRKH produces symptoms in other parts of the body rather than only the reproductive organs. People born with type 2 MRKH may have heart defects, hearing loss, atypical vertebrae, abnormally formed kidneys, or only one kidney. These congenital anomalies are evaluated via MRI or transabdominal ultrasonography.

Intersex variations are diagnosed using physical exams, genetic testing, hormonal testing, and medical imaging or laparoscopy. Getting a diagnosis by evaluating the individual's DNA molecules is preferred for future medical predictions, but is not always possible. Intersex variations may become apparent at birth, during puberty, or while trying to have children. Intersex variations may cause a delay in puberty, absence of puberty, or bodily changes unexpected for one's perceived sex. Genetic counsellors can help an intersex person or their family understand their diagnosis and its genetic impacts on health.

Some intersex variations can be detected before birth. Screening cell-free DNA (DNA fragments found in bodily fluids like plasma) can detect if a fetus has Turner syndrome or Klinefelter syndrome. Ultrasounds may show ambiguous genitalia or genitals that do not match what is expected based on the sex chromosomes found in the cell-free fetal DNA screening. For those using in vitro fertilization, genetic testing before an embryo is implanted can detect intersex variations such as congenital adrenal hyperplasia and androgen insensitivity syndrome. 21-hydroxylase deficiency can be treated during pregnancy using a medication called dexamethasone to prevent ambiguous genitalia.

Sometimes an intersex variation may never be diagnosed. Most infants with intersex variations are born with either male or female genitals and assigned a binary sex. Intersex people with ambiguous genitals are uncommon (1 in 2000 births).

== Medical characterization and nomenclature ==
=== Hermaphrodite and related terminology ===
The term "hermaphrodite", originating from the Greek god Hermaphroditus, was previously used to describe intersex people. The word first entered the English language in the 1398 translation of De proprietatibus rerum (English: On the Properties of Things); it was used to describe animals with "unperfect" combinations of male and female traits. In the 1700s, it became used to describe plants and certain species of worms and molluscs that had both male and female reproductive organs. When the term was used to describe people or more complex animals, it evoked the idea of a horrid deformity. The term was also used to describe masculine women or feminine men, such as Sir Robert Wilson's 1803 journal entry about "The revolting hermaphrodisy of the 'blue stocking' [highly educated women]."

Intersex bodies became a subject of scientific fascination in the 1800s, with a desire to find bodies that were both fully reproductively male and female; this pursuit was never achieved. Human sexes became categorized into five types: male, female, male psuedohermaphodite, female psuedohermaphrodite, and true hermaphrodite. Female pseudohermaphrodites were people who had ovaries, XX chromosomes, and virilized external genitals such as an enlarged clitoris or labia majora that resembles a scrotum. Male pseudohermaphrodites were people with testes and XY chromosomes that are not fully virilized with features such as a small penis or a perineal hypospadia. People under the label of true hermaphrodites had both male and female gonadal tissue.

Classifying sex solely by gonads is viewed as inaccurate following research from the mid-1900s onward. Embryological experiments discovered that sex development has two phases: sex differentiation, the development of external genitals, and sex determination, the orientation of originally undifferentiated gonads. The old classification system also has the potential to assign incongruent gender-labelling, such as labeling someone who has a feminine appearance and gender identity as a male psuedohermaphrodite.

Pseudohermaphrodism was removed as a diagnostic category from the ICD-11, and true hermaphrodism was replaced with the term "ovotesticular DSD". While the word "hermaphrodite" has been reclaimed by some intersex people, it generally should be avoided according to the Intersex Society of North America. It can imply that people can be born with two sets of genitals, something which is not possible, and additional labels like "pseudo" and "true" can imply authenticity or lack thereof. It is also associated with the paraphillia of those who seek sexual gratification from someone who is both a man and woman.

=== DSD, VSC, and intersex ===
The term "disorders of sex development", often abbreviated as DSD, is contentious as some organizations and intersex advocates believe that being intersex should not be pathologized. For instance, Planned Parenthood describes being intersex as a "naturally occurring variation" rather than a medical problem. Professor Elizabeth Reis supports changing disorders of sex development to divergence of sex development, writing that "using divergence, intersex people would not be labeled as being in a physical state absolutely in need of repair." DSD is sometimes used to abbreviate differences of sex development rather than disorders of sex development.

Some parents of intersex children prefer the term "disorders of sex development" because the term intersex evokes ideas of sexuality or that their child is a third gender rather than a boy or girl. Some people with intersex variations prefer using DSD instead of intersex because they see their variation as a medical condition rather than an identity. 60 percent of Australian intersex people prefer the term "intersex" or a related term such as "intersex variation", and 3 percent prefer the term "disorder of sex development" outside of seeking medical care.

The term "intersex" has been criticized by clinicians and parents who believe the term only applies to those with ambiguous genitals or whose chromosomes and anatomy do not align. Disagreement remains over which variations should be considered intersex. Variations of sex characteristics, sometimes abbreviated as VSC, is an alternative term used to avoid the stigma associated with DSD. It is supported by some advocates to express a spectrum of sex variations and include people who prefer not to identify as intersex.

=== Classifying intersex ===
There has been a history of disagreement over which variations should count as intersex. Sexologist Anne Fausto-Sterling, whose research created the estimate of 1.7 percent of the population being intersex, defined intersex people with a mix of "anatomical components conventionally attributed to both males and females." Her work included both Klinefelter syndrome and Turner syndrome as intersex variations. In 2002, two years after Fausto-Sterling, psychologist Leonard Sax disputed her figures. He defined intersex people as those "who have XY chromosomes with predominantly female anatomy, XX chromosomes with predominantly male anatomy, or ambiguous or mixed genitalia." His definition excluded Turner syndrome and Klinefelter syndrome since they did not cause ambiguous genitals or "confusion regarding sexual identity."

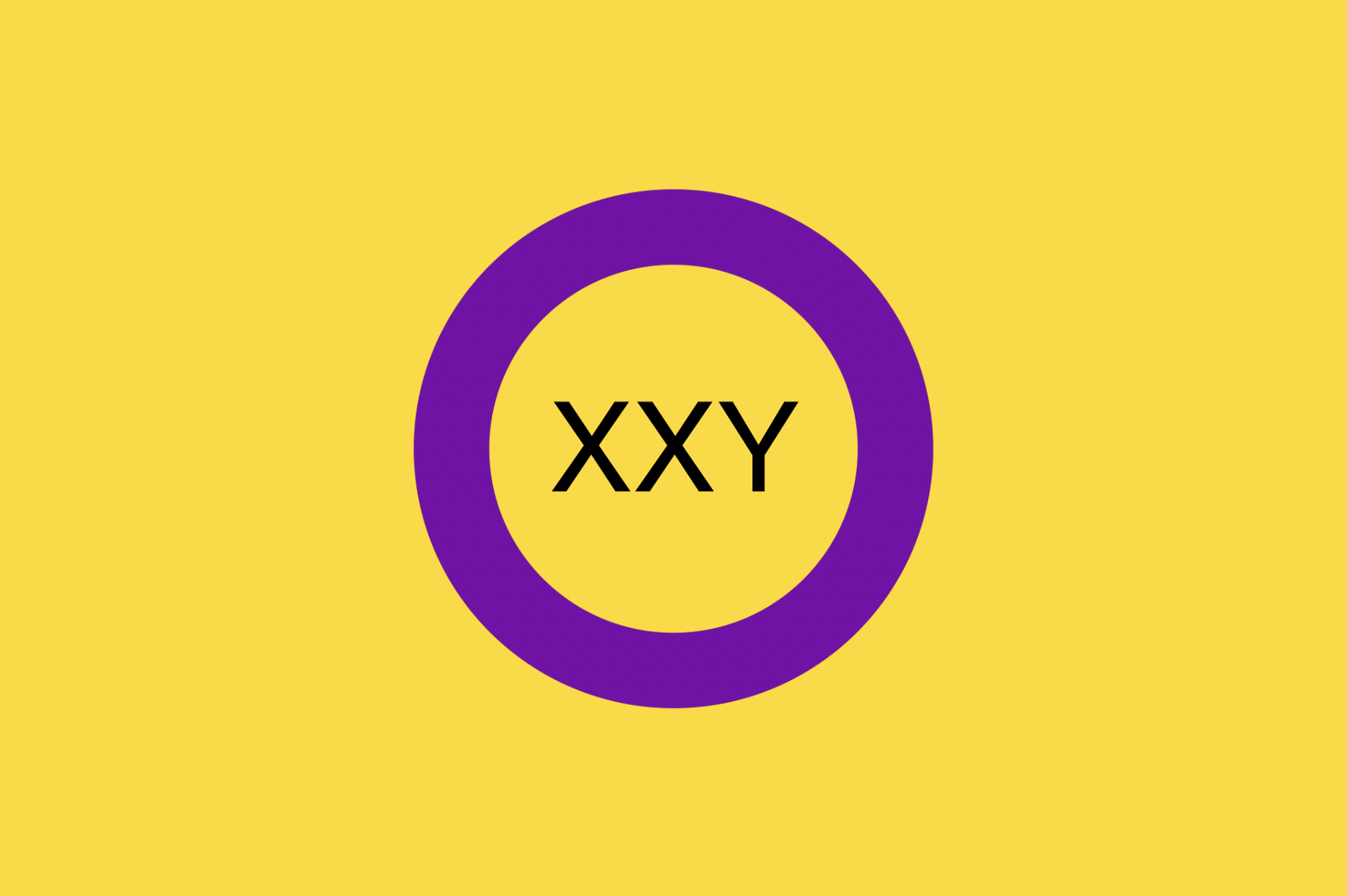
Intersex flag with XXY added in the center to represent Klinefelter syndrome

In 2006, the "Consensus Statement on the Management of Intersex Disorders" defined disorders of sex development as "congenital conditions in which development of chromosomal, gonadal, or anatomical sex is atypical." This definition included both Turner syndrome and Klinefelter syndrome. Disagreement over intersex classification still continued. A 2010 article in the Journal of Pediatric Urology argued for a return of classifying intersex conditions by gonads. This classification would include intersex variations that develop in the first trimester of pregnancy and exclude Klinefelter syndrome and Turner syndrome.

Sometimes what is considered intersex as an identity varies from what is considered a disorder of sex development medically. For instance, polyendocrine metabolic ovarian syndrome (PMOS) can sometimes cause hyperandrogenism, leading to significant changes in secondary sex characteristics. It is not medically considered a disorder of sex development; however, some people use the label of intersex because they feel it describes how they experience life with PMOS.

== Healthcare needs ==
=== Physical health ===
Bone health is a common concern for intersex people. For instance, people with complete androgen insensitivity syndrome (CAIS) have low bone density as a result of "decreased circulating estrogen and skeletal resistance to androgen action." Some intersex people no longer produce their own sex hormones due to receiving a gonadectomy (surgical removal of the gonads). This necessitates the use of long term hormone therapy to maintain bone health.

People with Turner syndrome, gonadal dysgenesis, Klinefelter syndrome and congenital adrenal hyperplasia also face issues with bone health, particularly osteopenia and osteoporosis. In Klinefelter syndrome and gonadal dysgenesis, this is caused by insufficient sex hormones. In CAH, it is due to excessive adrenal androgen as well as lifelong treatment with glucocorticoid, a type of steroid. Bone health can be maintained through monitoring bone mineral density using dual-energy x-ray absorptiometry and providing hormone replacement therapy to prevent osteoporosis.

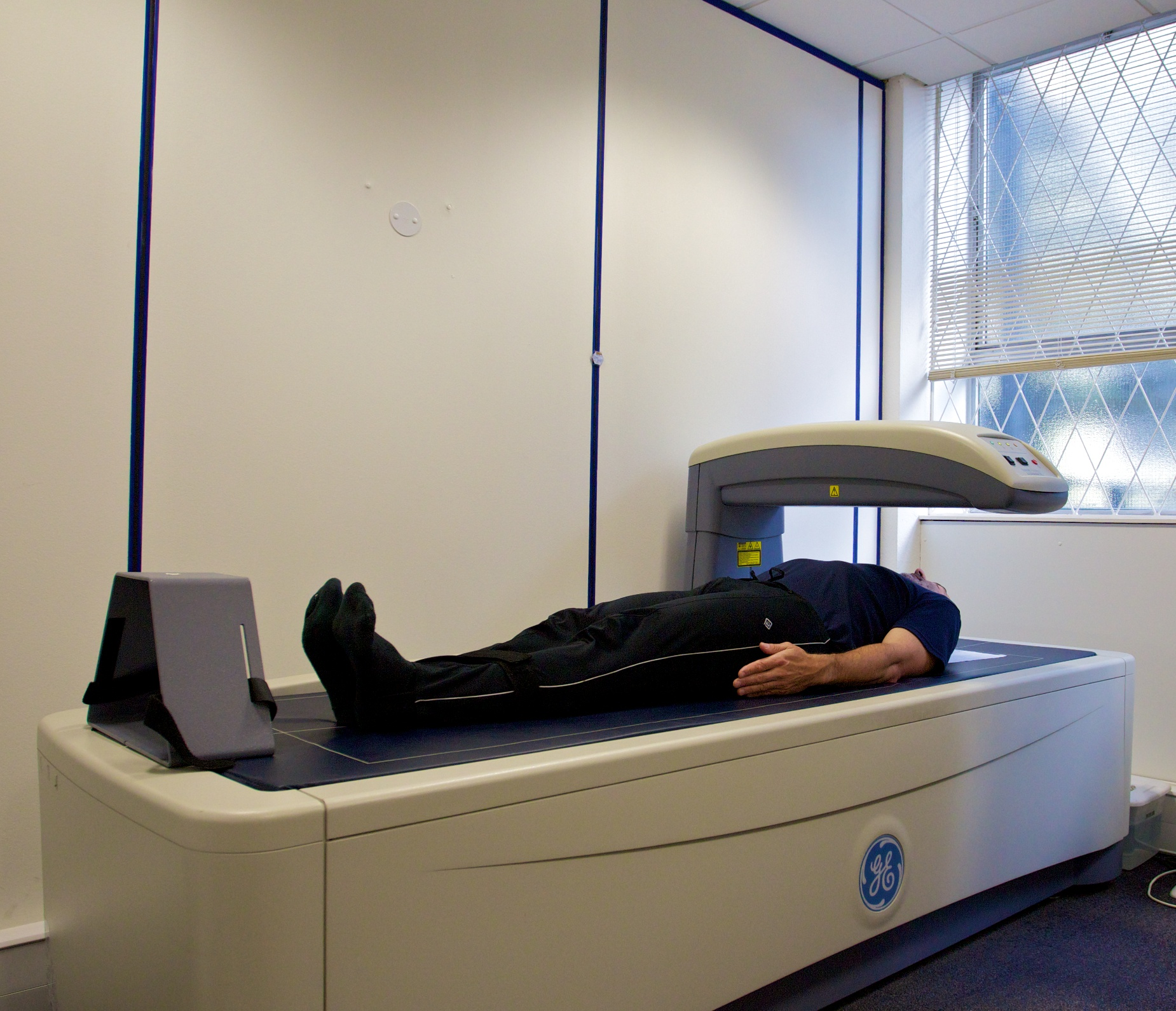
Example of dual-energy x-ray absorptiometry scanner

Hormone replacement serves additional purposes other than just maintaining bone health. In those with CAH, steroids called mineralocorticoids help regulate salt and water in the body to prevent salt-wasting (an imbalance of salt in the body). In people with CAH, glucocorticoids are used to fill for a lack of endogenous cortisol, which is important for regulating neurologic, metabolic, and cardiovascular functions. Glucocorticoids reduce excess adrenocorticotropic hormone and excess adrenal androgens; the former increases the risk of testicular adrenal rest tumors and the latter potentially causes fertility issues. Supraphysiologic doses, or doses greater than needed to replace absent cortisol, are often prescribed for this purpose. Glucocorticoid treament is necessary to prevent adrenal insufficiency, adrenal crisis, and episodes of hypoglycemia (low blood sugar). Treatment with glucocorticoids, especially at supraphysiologic doses, can adverse effects such as high blood pressure, high blood sugar, type two diabetes, hyperlipdemia, sleep apnea, and growth supression in children.

Some intersex people need to be provided oestrogen or testosterone to induce puberty. This is needed to help the body mature and develop secondary sex characteristics, which allows intersex people to develop alongside their peers, and prevent delayed intellectual, social, and emotional development.

Some intersex variations are associated with an increased risk of cancer. Men with Klinefelter syndrome, especially those with mosaicism, are at a higher risk of dying from breast cancer than endosex men. People with Klinefelter syndrome are at an increased risk of developing mediastinal extragonadal germ cell tumors, non-Hodgkin lymphoma, leukemia, and hematological malignancy (i.e cancer of immune cells or tissue that makes blood). Those with Swyer syndrome are at an increased risk of developing cancer, specifically germ cell tumors, if atypical gonads are not removed.

Gonadoblastomas are precancerous lesions that predominantly form in intersex people with gonadal dysgenesis and a Y chromosome. This includes conditions such as Swyer syndrome or Turner syndrome with Y chromosome mosaicism. These cancer risks are generally addressed through genetic screening and a gonadectomy if necessary.

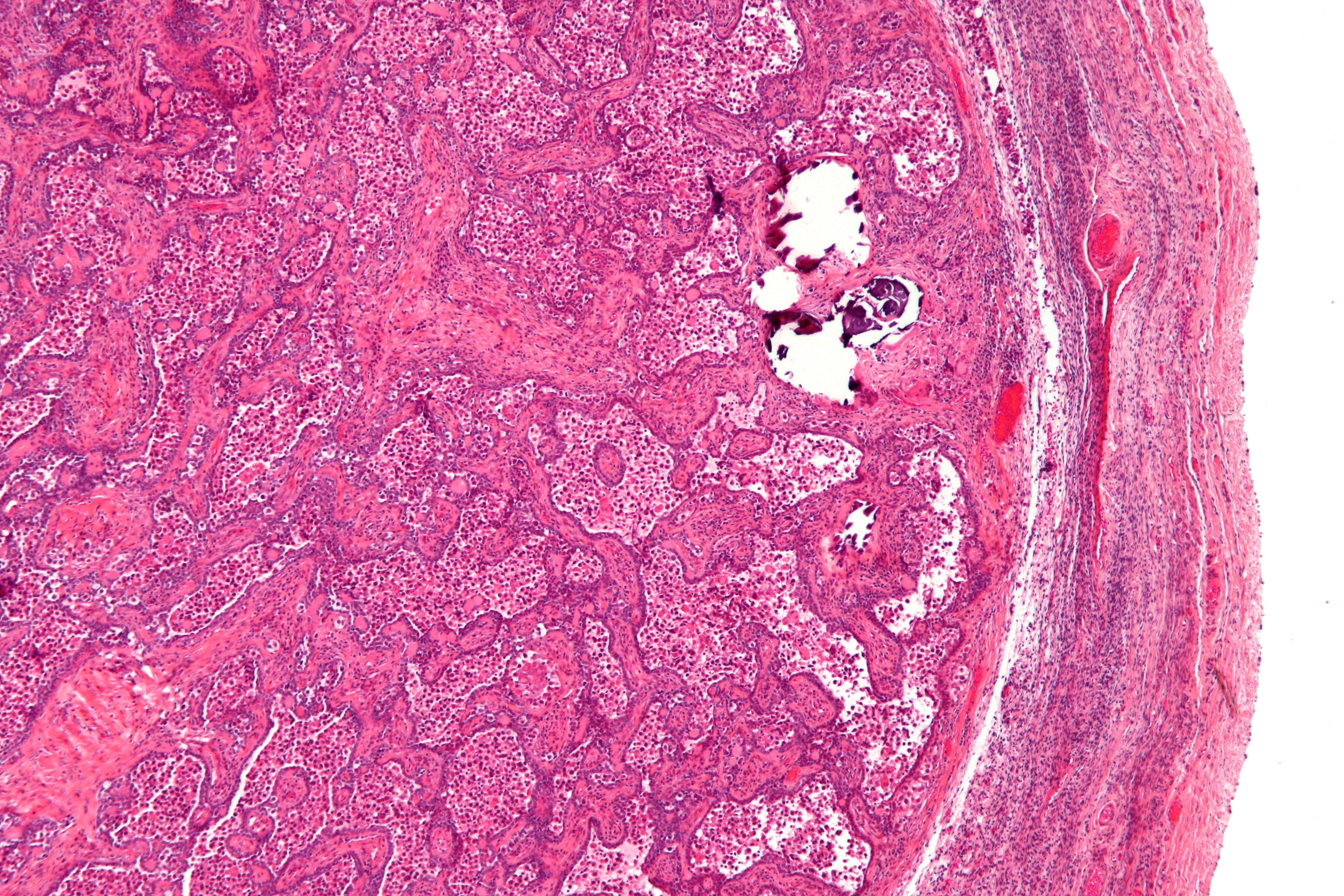
Image of gonadoblastoma at low magnification

The undescended testes of those with androgen insensitivity syndrome also pose a cancer risk. Those with complete androgen insensitivity syndrome have a 3.6 percent chance of developing a malignant tumor by age 25 and a 33 percent chance by age 50, though malignancy before adulthood is rare. Partial androgen insensitivity syndrome poses a higher cancer risk if undescended testes are present. The risk for germ cell tumors from undescended testes is 15 to 50 percent, but the risk for testes surgically moved to the scrotum is unknown. Orchiectomy, removal of the testes, is a preventative treatment option for these cancer risks. For those with partial androgen insensitivity syndrome who are raised male, a procedure to put the testes into the scrotum called an orchiopexy is done to lower the risk of malignancy.

Some intersex variations are associated with metabolic and cardiovascular conditions. Those with XY DSD are more likely to be born with heart defects. Intersex variations in sex chromosomes are associated with an increased risk of both type one and type two diabetes.

Turner syndrome, one such chromosomal intersex variation, is also associated with high blood pressure. 23 to 50 percent of those with Turner syndrome are born with congenital heart abnormalities. Fetuses with confirmed or suspected Turner syndrome should receive a fetal echocardiogram. Children born with Turner syndrome and accompanying heart abnormalities are recommended to receive care from a pediatric cardiologist.

Some intersex conditions coincide with kidney abnormalities. People with androgen insensitivity syndrome may have atypical kidneys or upper urinary tracts. Hypospadias may also be related to urinary tract anomalies, though existing research is conflicting. People with Herlyn-Werner-Wunderlich syndrome can be born with one kidney. Urinary tract ultrasounds can be used to check for kidney abnormalities in those with Herlyn-Werner-Wunderlich syndrome.

Other types of anomalies may be present at birth. For example, most people born with campomelic dysplasia have micrognathism, a small lower jaw, and laryngomalacia, floppy cartilage in the larynx that obstructs one's airway. Cleft palates are also present in most people born with the condition. Cleft palates, severe laryngomalacia and micrognathia are treatable through surgery.

=== Sexual health ===
Fertility varies depending on the intersex variations one has. For instance, people with Turner syndrome can become pregnant with donor eggs or, more rarely, become pregnant unassisted; meanwhile, men with 46 XX are always infertile. Fertility counseling can be provided by a clinician to address fertility complications caused by the patient's intersex variation and what treatment options are available.

Procedures such as testicular sperm extraction, in vitro fertilization, or receiving a uterus transplant can help some intersex people have children. People with MRKH syndrome, a rare intersex condition causing an absent or underdeveloped vagina and uterus, can produce children with a surrogate and in-vitro fertilization of their own eggs since they usually have fully-formed ovaries. Since 2015, uterus transplants have allowed women with MRKH to give birth without a surrogate.

Intracytoplasmic sperm injection, a type of in vitro fertilization in which sperm is directly injected into an egg cell, is another tool for assisted reproduction. It can help people with 5-alpha-reductase type 2 deficiency or Klinefelter syndrome to have children. It can also be used in some cases of ovotesticular DSD if the father is able to produce sperm and has not had his testes removed. In-vitro fertilization with donor eggs allows people with a uterus but no ovaries to give birth, such as in some cases of Swyer syndrome.

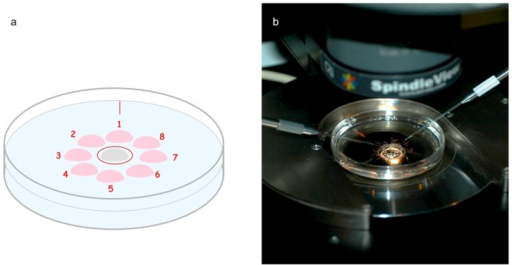
Dish used for intracytoplasmic sperm injection, a type of in-vitro fertilization used in cases of male infertility

Women with Turner syndrome lose their eggs at a fast rate compared to endosex women; before they are born, the majority of their egg cells are apoptopic, or in the process of dying. Most people with Turner syndrome experience early menopause. In some cases, cryopreservation is used to maintain reproductive options. For those with Turner syndrome who experience puberty and periods without medical intervention, primarily those with 45X/46XX mosaicism, eggs may be cryopreserved. In 2022, the first successful live birth using this method on a mother with mosaic Turner syndrome was documented.

Some intersex variations may result in increased risks of complications during pregnancy. Classical CAH is associated with higher risk of gestational diabetes. Those with classic CAH are at a higher risk of needing to deliver via cesarean section if they have previously undergone vaginoplasty. Those with CAH caused by 11-beta-hydroxylase deficiency often experience hypertension; it is advised that they receive care from cardiology specialists during pregnancy. Sixty percent of women with Turner syndrome who become pregnant via egg donation experience complications such as pre-eclampsia, preterm birth, and intrauterine growth restriction. There is also a risk of death for the mother due to root aortic dilation, or the ballooning of the large artery sending blood from the heart. This can result in aortic dissection, a splitting of the aorta's walls that causes blood to leak. Doctors recommend that women with Turner syndrome be informed of this risk, undergo cardiac review prior to pregnancy, and receive care from a multidisciplinary team while pregnant.

Some intersex people are more likely to experience sexual dissatisfaction or difficulty in sexual functioning. For example, 39.3 percent of men with Klinefelter syndrome and 37.1 to 44.1 percent of women with XY DSD are unsatisfied to very unsatisfied with their sex life, compared to 20.8 percent of the general population. This is not universal across all intersex variations, as those with Turner syndrome and CAH report sex life satisfaction closer to that of the general population.

Some intersex variations are associated with genital dissatisfaction, including concerns about penile length, vaginal length, and clitoral size. Intersex people who have undergone genital surgery may experience reduced sexual sensation and functioning as a result. As of 2020, young intersex people often experience sexual anxiety, and a quarter of intersex adults have not been in a romantic or sexual relationship.

Research suggests intersex patients should be offered psychological support or sex therapy if they express anxiety about sexual function or fear of intimacy. A sexologist can be included in a multidisciplinary team to help address sexual health concerns. Hormone replacement therapy can be used to maintain sexual functioning for some intersex variations such as ovotesticular DSD. For those with CAIS who have had a gonadectomy, androgen substitution can prove better for sexual well-being and ability to orgasm than oestrogen.

=== Mental health ===
Intersex people are at a high risk of developing mental health disorders. A review of 18 studies found that intersex people were more likely to have depressive and anxiety disorders. A survey of intersex adults in the U.S. found that 61.1% of respondents reported having depressive disorders compared to 19% of the general adult population. Post-traumatic stress disorder was also reported by 40.9% of those surveyed.

Surgeries on intersex people as infants can be a cause of mental trauma. Scarring, infertility, and other health issues caused by such surgeries can result in shame, gender dysphoria, sexual dysfunction and feeling betrayed or devalued. Stressful diagnosis procedures and medical treatments can feel like a challenge to one's gender identity, contributing to psychological distress and stigmatization. Intersex students are often the target of abuse at school, especially in bathrooms and changing rooms. Students whose appearance do not fit expected gender norms are at even greater risk of mistreatment. A survey in Mexico found that 26% of intersex respondents reported being bullied as children compared to about 15% of endosex respondents. Intersex students are often told to keep medical treatments secret by family members or clinicians, leading to further isolation and untreated trauma.

Intersex people are at an increased risk of suicide; in a European study, 6.8% of intersex people age 16 or older reporting having attempted suicide compared to 1.8% of the general population sampled. Intersex people are more likely to experience suicidal thoughts as well. In a Mexican survey, 16% of intersex respondents reported experiencing suicidal ideation compared to 10% of endosex women and 7% of endosex men. Intersex people can face issues that worsen their mental health such as stigma and discrimination, bullying, family rejection, tension with partners about fertility, etc.

It is not uncommon for intersex people born with ambiguous sex characteristics to experience gender dysphoria. A 2021 meta-analysis found that 15% of intersex people born with ambiguous sex characteristics experience gender identity disorder or gender dysphoria in adolescence or adulthood. Those assigned female at birth with 5-alpha-reductase deficiency or 17-hydroxysteroid dehydrogenase deficiency have a high prevalence of gender dysphoria (53% for both conditions). People assigned female at birth with CAH, CAIS, and complete gonadal dysgenesis have low prevalence of gender dysphoria.

Those with intersex variations should have a psychiatrist or psychologist working with a multidisciplinary team. Mental health professionals can aid intersex people when making choices about hormone treatments, gender assignment, gender reassignment, and surgeries. Psychotherapy can also be used to support self-acceptance. Psychological support for parents and family members helps reduce harm to an intersex child. This support helps by educating family against misconceptions about intersex variations, as well as encouraging parents to share age-appropriate information with their child. This aids in preventing secrecy about the child's intersex status.

Findings suggest peer support for intersex people and their parents can positively contribute to their well-being, though robust evidence is lacking. Peer support groups supervised by a facilitator serve to mitigate social isolation, provide emotional validation, and help members of the group process medical information. Accessing peer support can prove difficult due to lack of referrals.

=== Cognitive health and neurodevelopment ===
Some intersex variations can impact cognitive functioning or carry higher rates of neurodevelopmental conditions like autism or ADHD. Rates of autism symptoms are higher in intersex people. A survey of European intersex adults found a 9.1 percent prevalence, compared to 1 percent in the general adult population. This percentage differs depending on the particular intersex variation, with those with Klinefelter syndrome having the highest autism symptom prevalence of the variations measured.

Intersex people have no significant difference in intelligence quotient compared to endosex people. Other cognitive and neurodevelopmental differences depend on the particular variation. People with Turner syndrome are more likely to be diagnosed with attention deficit disorder, can struggle with social competence in both childhood and adulthood, and can have visuospatial deficits that negatively impact math ability. Those with Klinefelter syndrome are likely to experience language issues. 70 to 80 percent of people with Klinefelter syndrome experience language difficulties at an early age. Impairments in verbal fluency and naming viewed stimuli have been found in adolescents and adults. Reading difficulties are similarly common in children and adults with Klinefelter syndrome.

A psychologist can be consulted to assess learning difficulties if they are present. Academic accommodations, tutoring, or other forms of support may be equipped to help those with cognitive impairments. Psychiatric interventions and other supports may be needed throughout one's life to help with difficulties in executive and cognitive functioning. Mental health issues may be the main cause of executive function issues, as a study comparing intersex and endosex people found that there was no significant difference in executive function when adjusting for mental health.

== History ==
Intersex variations have been documented since antiquity. Intersex people were included in art and ancient myths such as the creation of an intersex person by the Sumerian gods Enki and Nimnak or Hermaphroditus in ancient Greece.

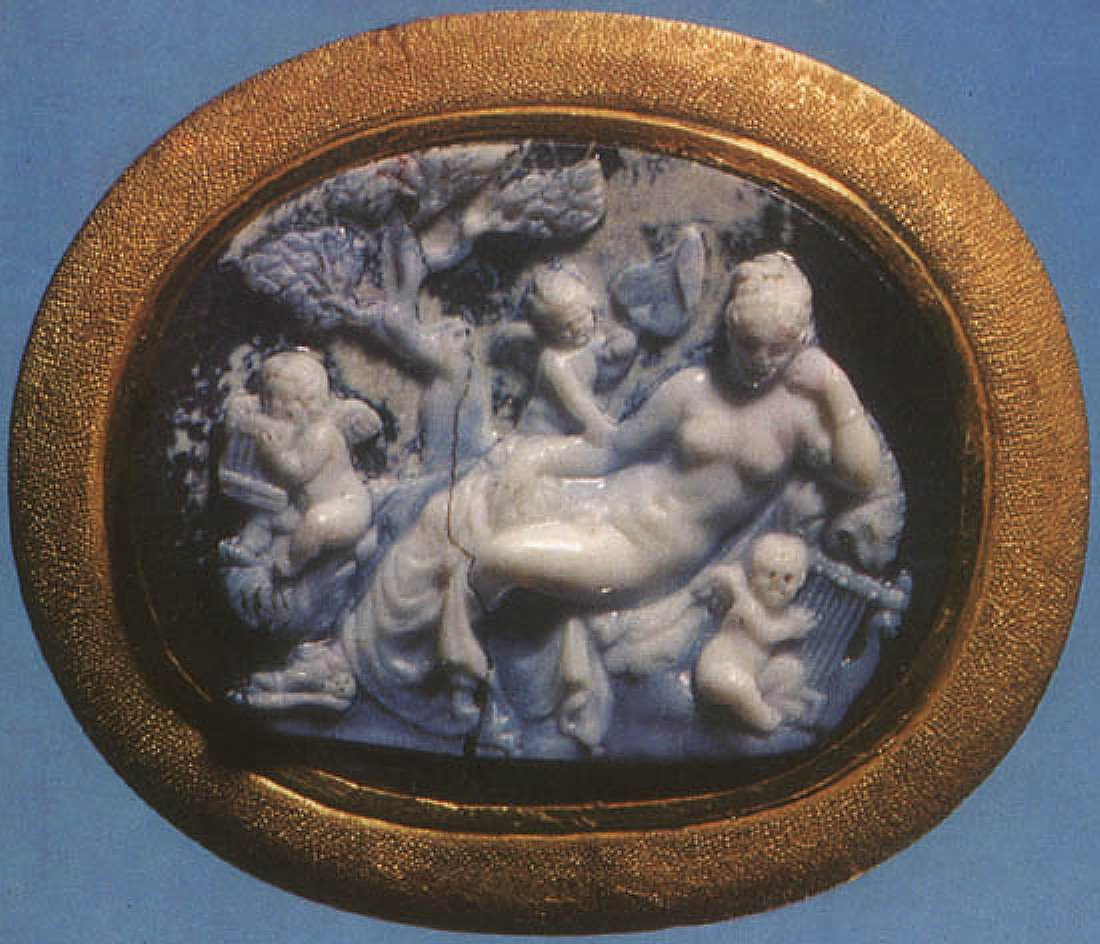
Sculpture of Hermaphroditus, an ancient Greek intersex god, from the first century BCE

The first surgery on ambiguous genitalia was recorded by historian Diodorus Siculus in the first century BCE. The patient, Callo, was believed to be female prior to having a fistula lanced, exposing testes and a penis. In the 600s CE, surgeon Paulus Aegineta described intersex conditions and hypospadias. This influenced later surgeons like Albucasis in the 11th century to write about surgeries for intersex genital variations such as clitoris removal. Ottoman surgeon Şerafeddin Sabuncuoğlu included an illustrated chapter about surgical treatments for intersex genital variations in his 15th century manuscript.

Starting in the 1600s, Europeans would portray South African bodies as "hermaphroditic" since it was seen as a primitive trait. The labia of "Hottentot" (racialized term for Khoekhoe) women became a point of interest for naturalists and travelers with dozens of publications describing them as the Cape of Good Hope was colonized. Elongated labia, labeled the "Hottentot apron" were seen as hermaphroditic and animalistic. Portrayals of African genitals as hermaphroditic would influence medical literature such as Bantu Gynaecology (1819) by J.J. Virey and A Textbook of the Diseases of Women (1894) by Henry Jacques Garrigues. African bodies would be exoticized objectified for their perceived hermaphroditic traits. For instance, "The Casting Project" (1907-1924) of the South Africa Museum exhibited photos and plaster casts of hundreds of Africans with a focus on genitals, particularly semi-erect penises and elongated labia minora. Museum modeler James Drury would go on to publish an article in The Medical Journal of South Africa, describing African women's genitals as masculine.

In the 1800s, medical professionals in Great Britain, France, and the United States began searching for definitive markers to determine what was thought to be the intersex person's true sex. These determinants were used to inform the patient of their true sex with the expectation that the patient would subsequently change to fit social norms. Scientific exhibitions would display both Africans and Europeans with perceived hermaphroditic traits such as women with beards or people with genital differences. The interest in intersex bodies and the cultural attitude of viewing them as monstrous would fuel the creation of teratology. Founded by Étienne and Isadore Saint-Hilaire in the 1830s, teratology focused on bodies seen as congenitally abnormal; it characterized variations in sex characteristics as pathologies to be cured.

In the 1910s, biopsies began to be used to diagnose intersex variations, while previously "true hermaphrodites" (those with male and female gonadal tissue) could only be diagnosed by castration or autopsy. The term "intersexuality" was created in 1915 by German biologist Richard Goldschmidt. He came up with the term while studying sphynx moths with sex characteristics between male and female. The term was adopted for pediatric use.

In the 1930s, surgeries intended to correct the genitals of intersex people were developed and became a standard treatment. At the time, surgeon Lennox Ross Broster described that corrective surgery would cause patients to "lose their acquired male characters, and revert to their normal feminine ones...[and] return to normal sexuality psychologically."

Broster worked with psychiatrist Clifford Allen towards understanding the psychological impacts of an intersex person's biology; both believed that psychological abnormalities would arise from atypical anatomy. In 1940, Allen argued for the separation of intersex people from endosex people desiring sex reassignment, providing surgical procedures only to intersex people while directing transgender people towards psychological services.

In the 1950s, medical advances emerged to evaluate a fetus' sex and birth defects such as ultrasound and amniocentesis. As technologies advanced, clinicians became able to detect intersex conditions such as congenital adrenal hyperplasia and Turner syndrome before the birth of the child.

The same decade, John Money theorized that children were gender neutral until the age of two, and gender could be assigned based on how a child was raised. Money and his colleagues, Joan and John Hampton, put forward several protocols for the management of intersex people that became greatly influential in the global north. For instance, he coined the term gender role initially as a diagnostic criteria to determine if someone with ambiguous genitalia was a male or female. Predictions of an infant's future gender role would inform what treatments the child received. Money's work promoted surgeries for intersex people, young children in particular. Clinicians often hid that a child was intersex both from patients and their parents.

Money's gender categorization and surgical approach was informed by norms at the time such as the belief in male-female dichotomy and a homosexual-heterosexual dichotomy. Correcting intersex bodies reinforced these norms by aiming to produce heterosexual males or females. His approach was also perpetuated by the pathologization of intersex people; it fit intersexuality into the medical process of diagnosis, analysis, and treatment. In other words, intersex conditions would be diagnosed and normalizing treatments were determined by analyzing which gender role the person fit most. This made his ideas agreeable to surgeons and psychologists, who could view their work as helping treat abnormal children.

In 1966, Money advised sex reassignment for a baby boy after a botched circumcision. The child would be raised as a girl until he learned the truth about his birth sex at age 15 and lived as a male after. When Money began publishing his findings in 1972, he portrayed it as a case of successful sex reassignment supporting his idea that gender could be changed at an early age. This case, which became known as the Joan/John case, would be followed in medical literature and mainstream press for decades. Money's publications on this case perpetuated the practice of performing normalizing surgeries on intersex children by portraying a child's gender identity as changeable through upbringing.

The first intersex support groups formed in the 1980s, starting with Canadian support groups for Turner syndrome in 1981. The later half of the decade saw a rise in advocacy against normalizing surgeries from patients and the start of objections from professionals. Intersex activists continued to challenge the use of corrective genital surgery and the stigma around intersex variations the following decade; in 1993, activist Bo Laurent, also known as Cheryl Chase, formed the Intersex Society of North America.

In the early 1990s, feminist scholars began criticizing Johns Hopkins Hospital's medical policy for using gender norms to make predictions about the gender of intersex infants, as well as medically altering their bodies to fit those norms. In 1995, a paper advocating for withholding medical information from patients with androgen insensitivity syndrome was awarded second place in a medical ethics essay contest. The author received a cash prize from the Canadian Medical Association. In 1996, the first modern intersex public demonstration took place in Boston outside of the American Academy of Pediatrics' annual meeting.

In 2005, the European Society for Paediatric Endocrinology and the Wilkins Pediatric Endocrine Society held a conference with 50 international experts and two intersex participants decide which term should be used to refer to people with intersex variations. The term disorders of sex development, abbreviated as DSD, was chosen. In a 2006 consensus statement, the adoption of the term DSD was purposed. Since then, the term DSD has replaced intersexuality in pediatric use.

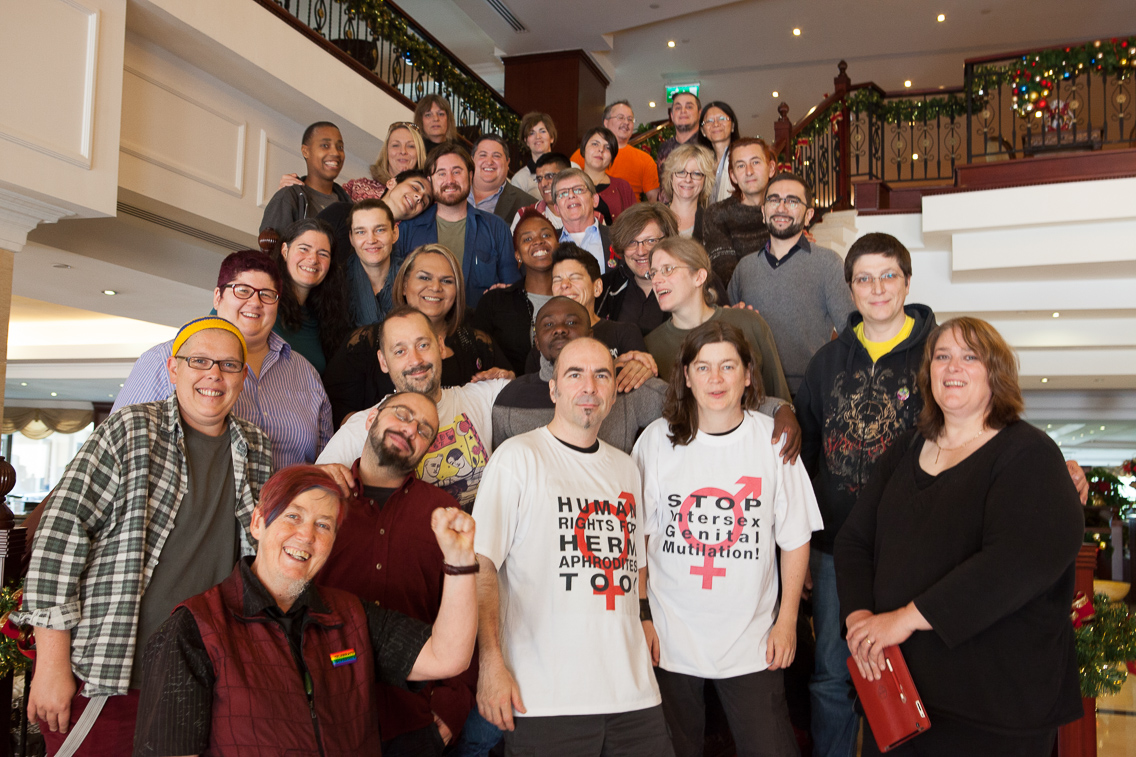
Attendees gathered at the third International Intersex Forum

In 2011, the first International Intersex Forum took place in Brussels, Belgium. The forum was designed for intersex activists, advocates and organizations to raise awareness towards intersex human rights issues and make political demands such as ending normalizing medical procedures and selective abortion of intersex fetuses. In 2013, the third International Intersex Forum created the Malta Declaration. This broadly outlines what the intersex community wants to achieve globally. Africa, Asia, Europe, Latin America and the Caribbean, Oceania, and North America each have regional additions to the declaration.

== Barriers to care ==
=== Medical trauma ===
Many intersex people have had negative medical experiences including childhood genital surgery, having their medical history hidden from them, pathologization of intersex variations, and genital examinations and photography. Genital surgery on young children, excessive medical exams and nonconsentual genital photography have been described as medicalized rape. According to the NNID Foundation, an intersex organization in the Netherlands,

These actions [of medicalized rape and sexual violence] include: grooming behaviour, provoking sexual arousal without consent sometimes even on small children, construction of vagina's [sic] on children and teens that require insertion of penis-shaped objects [vaginal dilation], repeated observing and examining genitals far beyond any level needed to provide care, but rather out of personal interest, and producing photographs and video's [sic] of intersex genitals without consent and spreading these images without restrictions.

These experiences negatively impact the well-being of intersex people. Vaginal dilation and surgeries early in life cause physical and psychological trauma. Nonconsensual surgeries can contribute to healthcare avoidance and medical distrust among intersex people, causing them to delay receiving preventative or emergency care. Excessive examinations or examinations done in with group of doctors or medical students can show disregard for an intersex person's privacy and consent, further contributing to feelings of shame, stigmatization, and healthcare avoidance later in life. Examinations like these have been conducted on intersex children and adults.

Corrective genital surgeries continue to be performed due to persisting beliefs by some doctors that young children will heal better, will not remember the procedure, and surgical correction could prevent the child from feeling psychological distress about their anatomy; these beliefs are lacking in supporting evidence. Another position is that parents should be allowed to consent to genital surgery if the child is too young. This is heavily disputed. When parents make decisions about surgery, they are often uninformed on intersex conditions, and conversations with clinicians often focus on "normalization." These interactions can overshadow informing the parents why corrective surgeries are controversial as well as the child's automony.

Intersex people may face many negative experiences from healthcare providers. According to the 2022 Pennsylvania LGBTQ Health Needs Assessment, 62 percent of intersex respondents received a negative reaction from a healthcare provider after disclosing their intersex status. 32 percent of intersex respondents feared seeking medical care. Some intersex people also have information about their diagnosis withheld from them, potentially leading to them learning about their condition in an unsupportive setting rather than from an (ideally) sensitive disclosure from a doctor.

=== Lack of quality data ===
Data is often collected from populations using either sex or gender, but not both. This results in problems when collecting data from intersex people. Uncertainty in how to answer can result in data being miscollected. Assumptions underlying questions about sex, such as expecting a respondent's sex characteristics not to vary from the sex they answered with, can lead to the misuse of data. These issues in data collection negatively impact the healthcare of intersex people as some tests and medical treatments are affected by one's sex. In some cases, data on intersex people may not be collected at all. Data systems supported or led by the Centers for Disease Control and Prevention between 2015 and 2018 collected no data on intersex conditions.

There is a lack of research into the general health, mental health, and cancer risks of intersex people. Intersex people are often not studied in the field of toxicology, making risk assessment for intersex patients difficult. Anesthesiology also under-represents intersex people. In 2016, none of the major anesthesiology journals reported if any of their participants were intersex. There is lack of research in fertility preservation for intersex people due to the larger focus on creating a normative sex presentation.

=== Inaccessibility ===
Intersex people have better outcomes when receiving specialized care. When intersex people reach adulthood, they can experience difficulty finding specialized care for their variations; this is in part due to a lack of specialists for adults with significant training about intersex conditions. A small European study found that 28 percent of adult intersex participants had difficulty accessing specialist care. In the U.S., insurance can be a barrier since insurers often assume that one's sex characteristics matches their gender or lack an understanding of the many possible variations anatomy and hormone profiles.

Stigma in healthcare settings poses another barrier. Astudy in Bangladesh found that intersex people were often turned away from government healthcare facilities. Less than half of intersex people succeeded in accessing care from government healthcare facilities, while over 80 percent managed to access care from private ones. Some of the barriers to care included unfriendly interactions with both physicians and nonclinical staff, excessive public attention due to their intersex status, public fear of interacting with intersex people, and limited treatment for patients who are neither male nor female.

Intersex people desiring psychological support may not be offered such services. Another study found that the majority of intersex patients had not been offered psychological counseling, and 27 percent reported not being offered counseling while having an unmet need for it. Intersex children can have difficulty finding support at school as well. There are no established standards for educational psychologists or counselors supporting intersex children, and peers are typically undereducated about intersex people.

Intersex people and their families frequently experience a lack of psychological support. About 40 percent of parents of intersex children in Germany requested psychological support, half of whom received it. When psychologists are included within multidisciplinary care teams for intersex patients, they often feel their role is marginalized by their peers. Family members of intersex children may feel that being referred to a psychologist implies they are not performing their role in the family well. Intersex people and their caretakers may also have negative perceptions about therapy, finding it taboo or unpleasant.

Intersex people experience issues accessing sexual health and affirming doctors. A survey from the United Kingdom's Government Equalities Office found that 11 percent of intersex participants reported that it was difficult to access sexual healthcare compared to 5 percent of endosex LGBT participants. In the UK, 6 percent of intersex people reported that their general practitioner was unsupportive compared to 2 percent of endosex LGBT people.

It is difficult for elderly intersex people to find providers capable of meeting their needs. They may fear living in retirement communities due to potential intolerance from other residents. Elderly intersex people can feel concerned about home care as well; they may fear caretaker abuse due to their intersex variation or surgical changes to their body.

=== Cost and availability in developing countries ===
Healthcare for intersex people in developing countries can be especially difficult to access due to cost or low availability. For instance, Vietnam only has one pediatric endocrinology department in the country, the National Hospital in Hanoi. Due to the lack of government funding towards healthcare, the cost of basic medications like estrogen tablets can be a major financial burden. In Bangladesh, the lack of treatment from government healthcare facilities can pose issues for intersex people if they cannot afford private care or do not have a private health facility near them. Rwanda, Kenya, and Uganda lack a statutory health insurance system. Only 4-5 percent of people in those countries have sickness insurance (insurance which provides pay outs if you get an illness), which can be a barrier for care. Even for those who do have sickness insurance, most plans do not include intersex conditions.

Cost can also influence what type of procedures are performed. In Zimbabwe, genetic testing to determine a child's sex is not offered in public hospitals, and testing can cost up to 1200 U.S dollars from private hospitals. This makes it cost prohibitive for many families. Since normalizing surgeries on intersex infants are offered for free in public hospitals, this can lead parents to opt for these procedures to assign a child's sex instead of testing.

Lack of expertise and resources can also hinder diagnosis of intersex conditions. Radiography and ultrasound diagnosis can be unreliable depending on the age of the patient and the experience level of the operator. This can be an issue in developing countries, where skilled operators are scarce. Doctors in developing countries may lack access to continuing medical education, causing them to lack the knowledge to diagnose uncommon intersex variations.

=== Cultural conflicts ===
In India, parents often argue with physicians when an intersex child is assigned female. Due to women often being economically dependent on men, there is a fear that an intersex woman will not be able to get a husband, especially if her intersex variation makes her infertile. This could cause her to financially depend on her family for life or become impoverished.

In developing countries, an intersex woman may also have difficulty finding work if infertility causes her to remain unmarried due to the overarching social stigma towards unmarried women. Oldest sons are also expected to financially provide for their parents. Together, cultural preferences for sons and the importance of marriage for women can cause families with intersex children to put off seeking medical care. It can also contribute to healthcare inequality with care being sought out more for intersex boys than intersex girls. In Pakistan, infant girls with salt-wasting CAH often die due to lack of medical diagnosis and treatment.

Fears about marriage and financial security also impact sex assignment in Egypt and Saudi Arabia. Due to this, about 60 percent of intersex children are raised male in Egypt. Preference for assigning intersex children as male has also been observed in Thailand, Malaysia, and Turkey.

Cultures in some African countries such South Africa and Uganda see an intersex infant as a curse, witchcraft, divine punishment, or a bad omen. These beliefs can lead to an intersex child being ostracized, abandoned, or killed after birth. Intersex infants in South Africa are abandoned in the hospital or place of birth. Midwives in South Africa have admitted to killing intersex infants. While the rates of this practice are unknown, an informal study found that 88 out of 90 midwives interviewed admitted to killing infants with ambiguous genitals. Midwives often lie to the mother, saying the child was stillborn. The stigma, fear and shame around having an intersex child can be immense. The mother is seen as responsible for the birth of her child, so she is blamed if a child is intersex. Mothers may choose for their intersex children to die so they can retain their place in their community and society.

Intersex infanticide is not an issue exclusive to South Africa. Julius Kaggwa, the executive director of the intersex rights organization SIPD Uganda, says that "In many African countries, the traditional way of dealing with perceived sexuality ‘abnormalities’ has largely been staying silent – and wishing them away through various kinds of traditional rituals, which often meant killing the intersex infants."

According to a 2015 report from an organization in Hong Kong, intersex infants were at risk of being killed like female and disabled infants under the previous one child policy. This is because Chinese culture is patriarchal with a preference for a son to continue on the family line. The preference for sons also impacts sex assignment surgeries. Within Chinese culture, being intersex is pathologized. Intersex children and teens are surgically assigned male if possible. There is little regard for autonomy or survival outcomes in this process; it can cause lasting physical and psychological trauma.

Sex assignment can be impactful later in life because if an intersex person wishes to identify as a different gender in adulthood, getting documents changed can be difficult. While some areas will accept a medical certificate that the person was born intersex, others may require that the person undergo surgery to then match the opposite sex, and there are no non-binary options. In Hong Kong, sex reassignment surgery is also required if an intersex person wishes to marry someone with the same sex as the one assigned to them in childhood.

== Advocacy ==
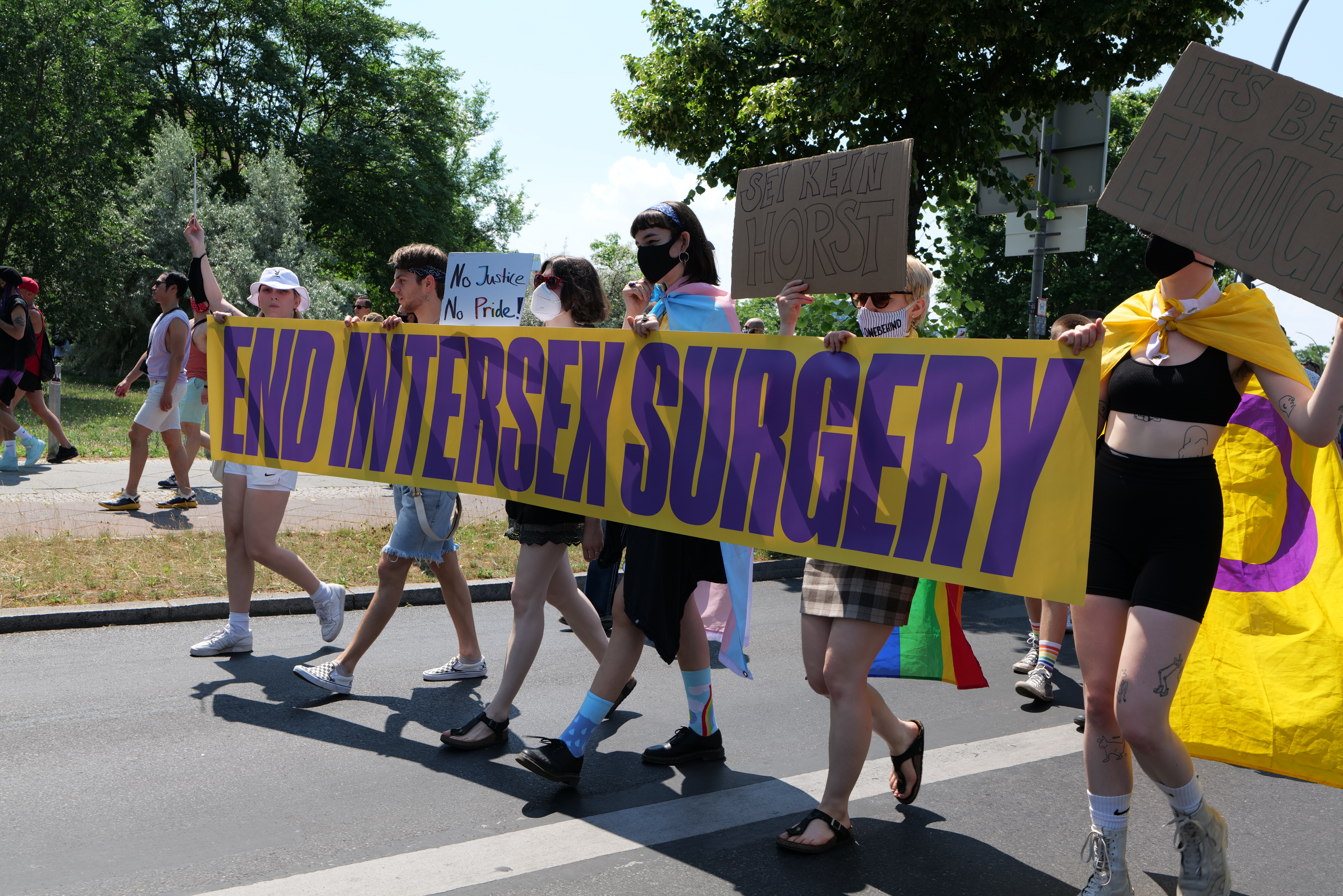
Protesters calling for an end to intersex surgery at a pride demonstration

Intersex and human rights organizations advocate against medically unnecessary genital surgeries on young children. Deferral of procedures is promoted whenever possible so patients are old enough to provide consent. Clinician advocates have worked with professional organizations to write position statements in support of deferring non-essential genital surgery until a child is older. Most discourse criticizing nonconsensual normalizing surgeries, also called intersex genital mutilation, comes from Western countries. However, Eastern organizations such as Intersex Asia and Intersex South Africa oppose intersex genital mutilation as well.

Advocates promote patient-centered care rather than procedures to ease parents. Intersex organizations and clinician advocates both promote mental health support of intersex people as a key part of intersex healthcare. Other changes supported by intersex advocates include ensuring intersex patients have access to medical records, acquiring government reparations for those who have received medically unnecessary surgery or demeaning treatment, and holding doctors who have given such treatment legally accountable.

Intersex activists also advocate against sex-selective abortion of intersex fetuses. Prenatal testing can detect chromosomal intersex variations, leading some parents to feel pressured to abort the fetus due to a lack of information about these conditions. NNID views the use of medical testing for intersex prevention as "a form of eugenics". The Malta Declaration from the Third Intersex International Forum includes "To put an end to preimplantation genetic diagnosis, pre-natal screening and treatment, and selective abortion of intersex foetuses" on its list of demands.

Ensuring intersex people are respected in medical settings is another priority for intersex rights. Lambda Legal and InterACT support hospitals adding language to their patients' bill of rights to explicitly state the rights to nondiscrimination, privacy, and respect for intersex people. Advocates also support educating medical staff about respect and privacy for intersex patients; this is meant to protect their physical integrity and autonomy.

Another initiative in intersex advocacy is high-quality and respectful research about intersex people. Common research issues cited by advocates include focusing predominantly on children instead of adults, making assumptions about intersex people having other LGBTQ identities, framing intersex as a gender, researchers' lack of understanding on intersex issues, and representing data as LGBTI data despite not having a significant number of intersex participants. Organizations such as InterACT and Intersex Human Rights Australia provide guidance and encourage researchers to contact them early in a study's design process.
