= Berezkin =

Berezkin, also transliterated as Beryozkin (Belarusian: Бярозкін, Russian: Берёзкин) is a surname of Slavic-language origin. Notable people with this surname include:

- Aleksander Berezkin (born 1984), Russian intersex man
- Dmitry Berezkin (born 1963), Russian sailor
- Grigory Berezkin (born 1966), Russian oligarch
- Maxim Beryozkin (born 2001), Russian ice hockey winger
- Yevgeny Beryozkin (born 1996), Belarusian footballer
