= Irene Kuzemko =

Intersex activist

- Ірина Куземко
- Born: 1993; Lviv, Ukraine
- Occupation(s): Executive board member of OII Europe, co-founder of Intersex Russia
- Known for: Intersex human rights activist
- Website: www.irinakuzemko.com

Irene Kuzemko (Ukrainian: Ірина Куземко; Russian: Ирина Куземко), also transcribed from Ukrainian and Russian as Irina Kuzemko, is a Russian-Ukrainian intersex woman and intersex human rights activist. She co-founded Intersex Russia in 2017, is a youth member of interACT, and an executive board member of OII Europe. She have started her human rights advocacy as a member of Association of the Russian Speaking Intersex.

== Early life ==
Kuzemko was born in 1993 in Lviv, Ukraine with mixed gonadal dysgenesis and assigned female at birth. She was unaware of any difference in her body until puberty when her body failed to menstruate or grow breasts, and she was unaware of this possibility. Kuzemko was sent to Moscow aged 15 for medical treatment. She describes being left in the corridor while discussions about her body took place without her being present, experiences of shame, alienation and suicidality, and her father telling her she had "something wrong with [her] ovaries". She underwent surgery, awaking with her hands and legs tied down. Kuzemko first experienced menstruation at age 17.

She has described how she found out she was intersex when watching a BuzzFeed video about people with intersex variations, when she was aged 22. Kuzemko describes this moment as like "winning the jackpot" because she learned that other people with similar experiences existed. She states that knowing the truth about her body was liberating and helped her become confident.

Kuzemko requested her medical records and found out that she had XY chromosomes, and had been subjected to removal of an internal testis and fallopian tube without her knowledge.

== Activism ==
Kuzemko campaigns for bodily autonomy, and an end to secrecy and unnecessary medicalization, describing how medical intervention is still promoted by the Russian Ministry of Health. She have expressed concern about linking intersex and LGBT rights at a time of violence against LGBT people in Russia, and states:

I’m proud to be intersex, I’m not ashamed of it, and I don’t regret it. Intersex is not a medical problem, it is a human rights problem

She co-founded Intersex Russia in 2017 and is a youth member of interACT and an executive board member of OII Europe. She speaks internationally and contributes to work developing resources, and promoting sexual and reproductive rights.

== Selected bibliography ==
- OII Europe (November 2019). #MyIntersexStory (PDF). Dan Christian Ghattas, Ins A Kromminga, Irene Kuzemko, Kitty Anderson, Audrey Aegerter (eds.).
- Kuzemko, Irene (December 20, 2017). "Do I regret being born intersex?". Intersex Day.
