= Intersex Russia =

OII Russia
- Интерсекс Россия
- Formation: March 2017
- Purpose: Intersex human rights
- Region served: Russia
- Leader: Irina Kuzenko (activist)
- Affiliations: Organisation Intersex International
- Website: intersexrussia.org

Founded in 2017, Intersex Russia (Russian: Интерсекс Россия), also known as OII Russia, based in Moscow, Russia, is an organization working to spread awareness on topics of intersex, providing accurate and positive representation of the intersex community and the issues intersex people are facing, fighting pathologization and medicalization and providing support for intersex people. Irene Kuzemko is a co-founder of Intersex Russia.

== Mission ==
The organisation mission is to provide accurate and positive representation of the intersex community in Russia, to raise awareness about the existence of intersex people and the issues that intersex people face, to make a strong stance for de-pathologization and de-medicalization of the lives of intersex people, to create a strong network of intersex support groups across the country.

== Activities ==
As a result of Intersex Russia's work and advocacy in Russia and in Geneva during the third cycle of Universal Periodic Review, during the 30th Session of Universal Periodic Review of Russian Federation on May 14, 2018 Russia received its first ever specific intersex recommendation from Spain. This recommendation is one of the very few specific intersex recommendations ever given during the three UPR cycles to date.

The recommendation states:

Prohibit non-consensual medical interventions performed on intersex people until the person in question is old enough to grant the free and informed consent, unless the intervention is absolutely necessary for the development of their vital functions (6.229).

— Spain

Russian Government did not accept this recommendation and because of it, on September 21, 2018, when the United Nations held a session about the outcome of Universal Periodic Review of Russian Federation, Helen Nolan from International Service for Human Rights delivered OII Russia's joint oral statement with ISHR about the recommendation.

== Affiliations ==
Intersex Russia is affiliated to Organisation Intersex International.

== See also ==
- Association of the Russian Speaking Intersex
- Organisation Intersex International
- Intersex human rights
