= Asexuality and LGBTQ =

Relationship between different sex and gender minorities

Sign at the 2019 ColognePride that reads in English "aromanticism & asexuality are part of the LGBTQIAP+ community"

Asexuality is the lack of sexual attraction to others, or low or absent interest in or desire for sexual activity. Asexual people are often considered part of the LGBTQ or LGBTQIA+ community. The "A" in LGBTQIA+ typically stands for asexual/aromantic. Asexual people are sometimes referred to as aces. Not all asexual people identify as part of the LGBTQ community. Among those who use the split attraction model, asexuals may also identify as having a non-hetero romantic orientation, such as homoromantic, biromantic/panromantic, and aromantic. Some asexuals consider asexuality to be an inherently LGBTQ identity, while other asexuals do not. Some heteroromantic asexuals identify as straight rather than as LGBTQ.

== Asexuality and the LGBTQ community ==
According to a sample of over 40,000 youth taken by the The Trevor Project, around 10% of all LGBTQ youth identify as being asexual or part of the ace spectrum.

The Asexual Visibility and Education Network (AVEN) states that their organization "strongly believes in collaboration and support with LGBT+ groups, but it is up to the individual to determine if they identify as “queer” or part of the LGBT+ population".

Some LGBTQ organizations, such as the Human Rights Campaign, offer information and resources for asexual and aromantic people.

The letters "I" for intersex and "A" for asexual to form LGBTQIA or LGBTQIA+ are more recent additions to the initialism compared to "L" for lesbian, "G" for gay, "B" for bisexual, and "Q" for queer and/or questioning.

Some asexuals report feeling excluded from LGBTQ spaces or report feeling like they may be "not quite queer, but not quite not queer either". Asexual identity may have a complicated relationship with gay, lesbian, bisexual or queer identities, as those identities are often defined through sexual orientation. Some asexuals report feeling an impostor syndrome in LGBTQ spaces. Some allosexual people in the LGBTQ community may express anti-asexual sentiment (often known as acephobia or have the opinion that asexuality is not inherently LGBTQ or that some asexuals benefit from straight privilege. Some asexuals have the opinion that some LGBTQ spaces are often hypersexual or include too much discussion of sex or sexuality, or allege exclusion on this basis, which may be perceived as homophobic by allosexual LGBTQ people.

The debate over whether asexuals are inherently part of the LGBTQ community may be a sensitive issue. While some LGBTQ people may regard asexuals in general or cisgender heteroromantic or aromantic asexuals in particular as "not queer enough", some asexuals regard themselves as "just as queer" as other LGBTQ people or even as the "queerest" members of the LGBTQ community. Heteroromantic asexuals may believe or worry that they are not queer or "not queer enough", sometimes out of a desire to avoid speaking over or downplaying the struggles of LGBTQ people who identify as allosexual, homoromantic, biromantic, or queer. Critics of asexual inclusion within the LGBTQ community may allege that asexuals are "invading a minority community". Asexual supporters of asexual inclusion in the LGBTQ community may regard these opinions as discriminatory or as a form of gatekeeping. Some asexuals believe that asexuality constitutes a queer identity because asexuals are not heterosexual, deviate from common heteronormative assumptions about sexuality, and experience social discrimination, or because they do not believe same-sex attraction is necessary to be an LGBTQ person.

Asexual advocates sometimes think that it is cultural appropriation or a misconception to believe the "A" in LGBTQIA+ stands for "Ally", when it refers to asexuality and aromanticism, as they regard asexuals as LGBTQ people whereas allies are not LGBTQ people.

According to a 2014 community census from AVEN, 17.9% of asexual respondents reported that they only feel accepted as LGBTQ people within the LGBTQ community due to their romantic orientation or gender identity, such as identifying as homoromantic, biromantic, gay, lesbian, and/or transgender or non-binary. 14.1% of respondents reported that they never feel welcome in LGBTQ spaces. While the LGBTQ identity of asexuals frequently centers on discussions of whether heteroromantic asexuals and aromantic heterosexuals are LGBTQ people, some discussions may invalidate the legitimacy or existence of asexual identity more broadly. Despite debates about asexual inclusion in the LGBTQ community, overt expressions of anti-asexual sentiment are often uncommon or discouraged, as those spaces are often designed to be safe spaces. Some comments or behaviors in LGBTQ spaces that are alienating to asexual and/or aromantic people may sometimes be unintentional or be due to lack of knowledge of asexual and aromantic identities.

In addition to reports of exclusion or invisibility within wider LGBTQIA+ spaces and organizations, some asexuals report experiences of inclusivity and support.

== See also ==
- Intersex and LGBTQ
