= Intersex infanticide =

Intentional killing of intersex human infant

In some parts of the world, intersex newborns and infants are under the risk of being killed. Such intersex infanticide is practiced in Southeast Asia, China, and countries in the regions of Southern, Eastern, and Western Africa. Contributing factors include preference for males, traditional beliefs and superstitions, lack of legal protection for intersex children, resource scarcity, lack of education about intersex people, and stigma towards being intersex or having an intersex child. Data on the prevalence of intersex infanticide is sparse because it is often unreported or done in secret. Intersex infanticide is a violation of several human rights. Multiple United Nations committees and organizations have spoken out against intersex infanticide.

== Human rights violations ==
The Office of the United Nations High Commissioner for Human Rights defines infanticide as the killing of an infant in the first 12 months of life. It can include active infanticide (i.e. deliberate killing) or passive infanticide from neglect. Infanticide and infant abandonment of intersex children is a violation of several human rights including the right to life, freedom from torture and ill-treatment, freedom from discrimination, and the right of security of the person. It violates Article 3 of the Universal Declaration of Human Rights, Article 6 and 9 of the International Covenant on Civil and Political Rights, Article 21 of the Africa Charter on the Rights and Welfare of the Child, and Article 2 and 6 of the United Nations Convention on the Rights of the Child.

== Contributing factors ==
=== Preference for males ===
A Hong Kong based organization reported that during China's one child policy, the preference for sons to continue the family line lead to infanticide of girls, disabled infants, and intersex infants. Due to patriarchal beliefs in Southeast Asia, it is viewed as bad luck for a couple to have an intersex child, especially if they were trying for son after already having a daughter. This focus on the parents' misfortune is used to justify infanticide.

Intersex girls are especially susceptible to death by medical neglect. In Pakistan, infant girls with intersex traits are less likely to receive medical attention than infant boys with intersex traits. This is particularly evident in the types of congenital adrenal hyperplasia (CAH) in the population. CAH is an intersex variation which affects females. Three quarters of CAH cases are Classic CAH, which causes salt-wasting (problems regulating salt in blood) that can be fatal if left untreated. Most people with CAH in Pakistan have rarer variants that do not cause salt-wasting, showing that medical neglect of intersex girls has lead many of those with Classic CAH to die.

=== Traditional beliefs, superstition, and stigma ===
In Europe during the Middle Ages, intersex infants were viewed as monstrosities and killed. In some African countries such as Kenya, Uganda, Nigeria and South Africa, there is a cultural belief that intersex babies are the result of witchcraft, divine punishment, a curse, sorcery, or are a bad omen. Intersex children in Malawi are killed by traditional healers who believe the intersex child is a witch themself. In South Africa, midwives often kill intersex children and tell the mother that the child was stillborn. In an informal study, 88 out of 90 midwives admitted to killing intersex infants.

In some African cultures, the mother is seen as responsible for how her child is born, so mothers are often blamed if they have an intersex child. This can cause the mother to lose her position in her community and in society. A mother may abandon or kill her child to keep her place in her community and society. The stigma towards both intersex children and their parents is immense. Intersex children, sometimes viewed as half-humans or half-gods, can be seen as a result of sorcery or witchcraft done by the mother. This brings shame onto one's clan and family. Mothers may resort to abandoning intersex babies in latrines, trash heaps, the forest, or on the street. Surveys in Rwanda, Kenya, and Uganda show that rejection and social isolation towards the mother contribute to infanticide.

In Uganda, having an intersex child is viewed as a punishment for an offence committed by the mother her current life or in a previous life. This causes the community to cast out the mother and child, putting their survival at risk. These circumstances can cause mothers to kill their intersex children, hoping that the child's intersex status will go unnoticed during the funeral. In Ghana's Upper West region, the intersex child's mother is ostracized for bringing shame onto the land according to local beliefs. There have been cases of intersex infants being left in anthills under the belief that it will return them to where the came from.

In Zimbabwe, intersex infants are sometimes killed by their family members since intersex people are viewed as taboo. In some Southeast Asian countries, having an intersex child is met with sympathy and pity for the parents, viewing the child being intersex as a "grave misfortune." These views are used to justify infanticide in the region. In Afghanistan, families sometimes kill intersex babies and claim they were still born. This is done because having an intersex child is viewed as a source of shame by the community, and the child's intersex status would be a lifelong secret for the family.

Intersex infants have been victims of mercy killing. Mercy killing is when parents kill an infant with a disability or deformity under the belief that it is better for the child to die than live with the disability. Midwives may also participate in this practice, viewing it as an act of love or a way to protect the mother from community scrutiny. Poppy Ngubeni, a traditional healer and independent researcher in African medicine, describes intersex infanticide in Lesotho, saying "intersex babies (were) being thrown into the river; some bashed on big [rocks] or even left in the wilderness to be consumed by wild animals."

=== Lack of resources and education ===
Although intersex discrimination exists in both rich and poor countries, intersex infanticide is more common in poorer regions and areas without accessible healthcare. In Northern Uganda, food scarcity can lead parents to abandon intersex children that they view as a burden, leaving them in rebel camps or dilapidated mud huts. 55 percent of births in Uganda are supervised by traditional birth attendants who typically lack education on rights based care or management of intersex infants.

=== Lack of government protection ===
In India, though there is a government order in Tamil Nadu to cease sex-selective surgery on intersex children, there are no national laws specifically addressing intersex infanticide. Nepal lacks legal protection for the lives of intersex children too. In 2018, the Committee on the Elimination of Discrimination Against Women (CEDAW) sent a letter of interest on intersex issues, including infanticide; the Nepali government did not answer intersex-related concerns. These concerns were repeated in 2025. The Nepali government has yet to implement change according to CEDAW's recommendations.

== Prevalence and lack of data ==
There is a scarcity of data on the prevalence of intersex infanticide. According to India's LGBTQI+ groups, intersex infanticide is common in the country. Intersex infanticide occurs in Nepal, especially rural regions, though it tends to be undocumented. South Africa lacks data on how often intersex infanticide occurs. In Kenya, 34 cases of infanticide have been reported in 2018; it is unknown how many involved an intersex child. In Kenya, Rwanda, and Uganda, intersex infanticide is done soon after childbirth. Due to the stigma towards mothers of intersex children, families keep the circumstances of the child's birth a secret. As a result, most intersex infanticide in these countries are unreported.

== Advocacy and recommendations ==
Several United Nations committees including the Committee Against Torture, the Human Rights Committee, and the Committee on the Elimination of Discrimination against Women have expressed concern and told states affected by intersex infanticide to take countermeasures.

In 2015, the United Nations Office of the High Commissioner for Human Rights (OHCHR) had their first intersex expert meeting addressing issues that impact intersex people such as non-consentual sex assignment surgery and infanticide. The OHCHR published a background note on intersex issues in 2019 with a section dedicated to discussing violence and infantice targeting intersex people. In 2024, the United Nations Human Rights Council adopted the resolution "Combating discrimination, violence, and harmful practices against intersex persons." The resolution reaffirms the human rights of intersex people, calls for an OHCHR report on violence towards intersex people, and expresses concern for harmful practices used intersex people and children, and encourages regional and international organizations to combat violence, discrimination, stigma, and misinformation about intersex people.

The UN General Assembly's Human Rights Council says that countermeasures should target the root causes of intersex infanticide including the lack of punishment for perpetrators and the stigmatization of intersex variations. The UN Human Rights Committee recommends combating stigma through raising awareness and holding activities that increase community sensitivity. The Committee on the Elimination of Discrimination Against Women recommends legislation against harmful traditional practices including compensation for victims and the investigation, prosecution, and punishment of perpetrators. The United Nations Special Rapporteur on Extrajudicial Killings emphasizes that countries need to address the lack of consequences for killing intersex people.

A policy guide by the African Intersex Movement and the United Nations Development Programme, made several recommendations to addressing infanticide including: creating anti-discrimination laws protecting intersex people from harmful traditional and cultural practices; developing awareness-raising programmes to reduce discrimination and stigma while fostering social acceptance; and provide psychological support to help parents understand intersex bodies, thus avoiding infanticide and sometimes parental suicide as well.

In 2018, the intersex representatives from Thailand, Hong Kong, Taiwan, Indonesia, the Philippines, Vietnam, India, Nepal, Pakistan, and Myanmar met at the first Asian Intersex Forum and created a public statement. The statement addresses a variety of issues faced by intersex people and lists "put[ting] an end to infanticide, abandonment and honor killings of intersex people" as one of their demands. In 2017, the first African Intersex Meeting's public statement included a demand to "put an end to infanticide and killings of intersex people led by traditional and religious beliefs."

In 2018, the Kenya National Crime Commission released a report on the rights of intersex people. The report included a recommendation that the National Crime Research Centre work with the police to do a national study on intersex child abuse and infanticide. The study would serve both to understand the scope of the problem and come up with plans to address it.

Towards the end of 2024, the South African Human Rights Commission released pamphlets titled "Intersex Children: Guide for Parents" to be provided at healthcare facilities starting in early 2025. The pamphlets discuss a variety of issues including intersex infanticide with the aim of educating parents to prevent harmful decisions.

A program from Key Watch Ghana called Intersex Ghana works towards changing laws and policies to protect intersex kids from infanticide and intersex genital mutilation. Their work includes the documentary My Biology, My Truth which tells the story of four intersex people's lives in Ghana.

== See also ==
- Intersex human rights
- Intersex human rights reports
- Discrimination against intersex people
- Intersex healthcare
