= Aleksander Berezkin =

Intersex activist

- Александр Берёзкин
- Born: 1984 (age 41–42); Novokuznetsk, Russia
- Organization(s): Association of the Russian-Speaking Intersex (ARSI) and Intersex Immigrants Network
- Known for: Intersex human rights activist
- Website: arsintersex.org and aleksanderberezkin.weebly.com

Aleksander Berezkin (Russian: Александр Берёзкин) is a Russian intersex nonbinary person, refugee, and intersex human rights activist. He is a founder of the first Russian intersex human rights organization Association of the Russian Speaking Intersex (ARSI).

== Early life ==
Aleksandr was born in Novokuznetsk, Russia. He was diagnosed with Klinefelter syndrome at the age of 17, after learning about his diagnosis directly from his physician. He openly speaks about living with Klinefelter syndrome.

He has graduated with a BA in Sociology from Kemerovo State University and an MA in Sociology from Far Eastern State Technical University.

Aleksandr has stated that his physician told him he would never find someone else with his intersex variation, that he should keep it a secret, and never talk about his identity with anyone.

== Activism ==
Aleksandr started his advocacy in 2013, following a talk with Hida Viloria, working on intersex and LGBTI issues, organizing educational events for the LGBT community in Vladivostok. In 2014 Berezkin had to leave Russia as a result of a homophobic campaign against him. He sought political asylum in the United States on the basis that he was an LBGTQI activist. He was granted asylum in 2017.

In August 2013, he created a Facebook group called “The Association of the Russian-Speaking Intersex” (ARSI) for intersex people and allies, which further became the first Russian intersex human rights organization. In the following years, he acted as a Russian-Speaking Intersex consultant for the United Nations Free & Equal program.

Aleksandr spoke on health and civil rights issues.

Since 2021, Aleksander has been working on their Doctoral dissertation in Psychology, "A Micro-phenomenological Inquiry into Lived Embodied Experience and Consciousness of Intersex/Variations of Sex Characteristics (VSC) Migrants in the United States" at the California Institute of Integral Studies (San Francisco, CA)
