= Intersex human rights reports =

Intersex people are born with sex characteristics, such as chromosomes, gonads, hormones, or genitals that, according to the UN Office of the High Commissioner for Human Rights, "do not fit the typical definitions for male or female bodies". Such variations may involve genital ambiguity, and combinations of chromosomal genotype and sexual phenotype other than XY-male and XX-female.

Intersex infants and children may be subject to stigma, discrimination and human rights violations, including in education, employment and medical settings. Human rights violations in medical settings are increasingly recognized as human rights abuses. Other human rights and legal issues include the right to life, access to have standing to file compensation claims, access to information, and legal recognition.

== Community statements ==
=== Malta declaration, 2013 ===
The Malta declaration is the statement of the Third International Intersex Forum, which took place in Valletta, Malta, in 2013. The declaration was made by 34 people representing 30 organisations from multiple regions of the world.

The declaration affirmed the existence of intersex people and demanded an end to "discrimination against intersex people and to ensure the right of bodily integrity, physical autonomy and self-determination". For the first time, participants made a statement on birth registrations, in addition to other human rights issues.

=== Darlington Statement (Australia/New Zealand), 2017 ===
In March 2017, a consensus "Darlington Statement" was published by Australian and Aotearoa/New Zealand intersex community organizations and others. The statement calls for legal reform, including the criminalization of deferrable intersex medical interventions on children, an end to legal classification of sex, and improved access to peer support.

=== Vienna Statement (Europe), 2017 ===
A statement was published after a conference in Vienna in March 2017. It called for an end to human rights violations, and recognition of rights to bodily integrity, physical autonomy and self-determination. The statement included calls to action by governments, educational institutions, medical and health care providers, media, and allies.

== International and regional reports and statements ==
=== Yogyakarta Principles, 2006 ===
The 2006 Yogyakarta Principles on the Application of International Human Rights Law in relation to Sexual Orientation and Gender Identity is a set of principles relating to sexual orientation and gender identity, intended to apply international human rights law standards to address the abuse of the human rights of lesbian, gay, bisexual and transgender (LGBT) people. It briefly mentions intersex, influenced by the Declaration of Montreal which first demanded prohibition of unnecessary post-birth surgery to reinforce gender assignment until a child is old enough to understand and give informed consent. The Yogyakarta Principles detail this in the context of existing UN declarations and conventions under Principle 18, which called on states to:

B. Take all necessary legislative, administrative and other measures to ensure that no child's body is irreversibly altered by medical procedures in an attempt to impose a gender identity without the full, free and informed consent of the child in accordance with the age and maturity of the child and guided by the principle that in all actions concerning children, the best interests of the child shall be a primary consideration;

C. Establish child protection mechanisms whereby no child is at risk of, or subjected to, medical abuse;

— The Yogyakarta Principles

=== Report of UN Special Rapporteur on Torture, 2013 ===
On 1 February 2013, Juan E. Méndez, the UN Special Rapporteur on torture and other cruel, inhuman or degrading treatment or punishment, issued a statement condemning non-consensual surgical intervention on intersex people. His report states:

76. ... There is an abundance of accounts and testimonies of persons being denied medical treatment, subjected to verbal abuse and public humiliation, psychiatric evaluation, a variety of forced procedures such as sterilization, State-sponsored forcible ... hormone therapy and genital-normalizing surgeries under the guise of so called "reparative therapies". These procedures are rarely medically necessary, can cause scarring, loss of sexual sensation, pain, incontinence and lifelong depression and have also been criticized as being unscientific, potentially harmful and contributing to stigma (A/HRC/14/20, para. 23).

77. Children who are born with atypical sex characteristics are often subject to irreversible sex assignment, involuntary sterilization, involuntary genital normalizing surgery, performed without their informed consent, or that of their parents, "in an attempt to fix their sex", leaving them with permanent, irreversible infertility and causing severe mental suffering...

79. The mandate has noted that "members of sexual minorities are disproportionately subjected to torture and other forms of ill-treatment because they fail to conform to socially constructed gender expectations.

— UN Special Rapporteur on Torture

=== Resolution by the Council of Europe, 2013 ===
In October 2013, the Council of Europe adopted a resolution 1952, 'Children's right to physical integrity'. It calls on member states to

undertake further research to increase knowledge about the specific situation of intersex people, ensure that no-one is subjected to unnecessary medical or surgical treatment that is cosmetic rather than vital for health during infancy or childhood, guarantee bodily integrity, autonomy and self-determination to persons concerned, and provide families with intersex children with adequate counselling and support

— Resolution 1952/2013, Council of Europe

=== World Health Organization and UN interagency report, 2014 ===
In May 2014, the World Health Organization issued a joint statement on Eliminating forced, coercive and otherwise involuntary sterilization, An interagency statement with the OHCHR, UN Women, UNAIDS, UNDP, UNFPA and UNICEF. The report references the involuntary surgical "sex-normalising or other procedures" on "intersex persons". It questions the medical necessity of such treatments, patients' ability to consent, and a weak evidence base. The report recommends a range of guiding principles for medical treatment, including ensuring patient autonomy in decision-making, ensuring non-discrimination, accountability and access to remedies.

=== Council of Europe Issue Paper, 2015 ===
In a wide-ranging first detailed analysis on intersex health and human rights issues by an international institution, the Council of Europe published an Issue Paper entitled Human rights and intersex people in May 2015. The document highlighted an historic lack of attention to intersex human rights, stating that current social and biomedical understandings of sex and gender make intersex people "especially vulnerable" to human rights breaches. The report cited previous reports from San Francisco, the Swiss National Advisory Commission on Biomedical Ethics and the Australian Senate. The Commissioner for Human Rights made eight recommendations. For this first time, these recognized a right to not undergo sex assignment treatment.

=== UN Office of the High Commissioner for Human Rights report, 2015 ===
In 2015, the UN Office of the High Commissioner for Human Rights (OHCHR) described human rights violations against intersex people:

53. Many intersex children, born with atypical sex characteristics, are subjected to medically unnecessary surgery and treatment in an attempt to force their physical appearance to align with binary sex stereotypes. Such procedures are typically irreversible and can cause severe, long-term physical and psychological suffering.

The OHCHR acknowledged Australia and Malta as "the first countries to expressly prohibit discrimination against intersex persons," and Malta as "the first State to prohibit sex-assignment surgery or treatment on intersex minors without their informed consent." It called on UN member states to protect intersex persons from discrimination, and address violence by:

- "Banning "conversion" therapy, involuntary treatment, forced sterilization and forced genital and anal examinations;"
- "Prohibiting medically unnecessary procedures on intersex children"

=== WHO report, "Sexual health, human rights and the law", 2015 ===
In June 2015, the World Health Organization published a major report on sexual and reproductive rights and the law. Section 3.4.9, on intersex people, identifies discrimination and stigma within health systems (citations omitted):

Intersex people may face discrimination and stigma in the health system, in many cases being subjected to lack of quality of care, institutional violence and forced interventions throughout their lifetime. A major concern for intersex people is that so-called sex normalizing procedures are often undertaken during their infancy and childhood, to alter their bodies, particularly the sexual organs, to make them conform to gendered physical norms, including through repeated surgeries, hormonal interventions and other measures. As a result, such children may be subjected to medically unnecessary, often irreversible, interventions that may have lifelong consequences for their physical and mental health, including irreversible termination of all or some of their reproductive and sexual capacity.

The report stated that intersex persons are entitled "to access health services on the same basis as others, free from coercion, discrimination and violence", with the ability offer free and informed consent. The report also called for the education and training of medical and psychological professionals on "physical, biological and sexual diversity and integrity".

=== Asia Pacific Forum of NHRIs manual, 2016 ===
In 2016, the Asia Pacific Forum of National Human Rights Institutions (AFP) manual on Promoting and Protecting Human Rights in relation to Sexual Orientation, Gender Identity and Sex Characteristics. The document provides an analysis of human rights issues, including the rights to physical integrity, non-discrimination, effective remedies and redress, and recognition before the law. The report states:

Intersex people often experience human rights violations because their bodies are different. These include so-called ‘sex-normalising’ surgeries or hormone treatment on infants and children, that are medically unnecessary and typically performed when a child is too young to be involved in the decision-making process. These practices violate the right to physical integrity and have been described by human rights bodies as forms of torture or ill-treatment and as harmful practices. Fear and discrimination can never justify human rights abuses, including forced medical treatment. States have a duty to combat harmful stereotypes and discrimination against intersex people.

=== UN and regional experts statement, 2016 ===
For Intersex Awareness Day, October 26, UN experts including the Committee against Torture, the Committee on the Rights of the Child and the Committee on the Rights of Persons with Disabilities, along with the Council of Europe Commissioner for Human Rights, the Inter-American Commission on Human Rights and United Nations Special Rapporteurs called for an urgent end to human rights violations against intersex persons, including in medical settings. The experts also called for the investigation of human rights abuses, access to standing to file compensation claims, and the implementation of anti-discrimination measures.

States must, as a matter of urgency, prohibit medically unnecessary surgery and procedures on intersex children. They must uphold the autonomy of intersex adults and children and their rights to health, to physical and mental integrity, to live free from violence and harmful practices and to be free from torture and ill-treatment. Intersex children and their parents should be provided with support and counselling, including from peers.

The United Nations Office of the High Commissioner for Human Rights also launched a website, United Nations for Intersex Awareness.

=== Committee on Bioethics of the Council of Europe, 2017 ===
In January 2017, the Committee on Bioethics of the Council of Europe published a report on children's rights entitled, "The Rights of Children in Biomedicine: Challenges posed by scientific advances and uncertainties". The report was critical of the lack of evidence for early intersex medical interventions, stating that, on "the scientific question of whether intervention is necessary, only three medical procedures have been identified as meeting that criteria in some infants: (1) administration of endocrine treatment to prevent fatal salt-loss in some infants, (2) early removal of streak gonads in children with gonadal dysgenesis, and (3) surgery in rare cases to allow exstrophic conditions in which organs protrude from the abdominal wall or impair excretion".

== National and State reports and statements ==
=== San Francisco Human Rights Investigation, 2005 ===
The 2005 Human Rights Investigation into the Medical "Normalization" of Intersex People, by the Human Rights Commission of the City and County of San Francisco is thought "likely to be the first human rights report into the treatment of intersex people, certainly in the English language."

1. Infant genital surgeries and sex hormone treatments that are not performed for the treatment of physical illness, such as improving urinary tract or metabolic functioning, and have not been shown to alleviate pain or illness (hereafter referred to as "normalizing" interventions) are unnecessary and are not medical or social emergencies.
2. "Normalizing" interventions done without the patient's informed consent are inherent human rights abuses.
3. "Normalizing" interventions deprive intersex people of the opportunity to express their own identity and to experience their own intact physiology.
4. It is unethical to disregard a child's intrinsic human rights to privacy, dignity, autonomy, and physical integrity by altering genitals through irreversible surgeries for purely psychosocial and aesthetic rationales. It is wrong to deprive a person of the right to determine their sexual experience and identity. ...
5. It is ethically wrong to treat people differently or unfairly because they are perceived by others to be "monsters" or "oddities."

— Human Rights Commission of the City and County of San Francisco

=== Report of Swiss National Advisory Council on Biomedical Ethics, 2012 ===
In late 2012, the Swiss National Advisory Commission on Biomedical Ethics reported on intersex. The Commission report makes a strong case against medical intervention for "psychosocial" reasons:

Especially delicate are those cases where a psychosocial indication is used to justify the medical urgency of surgical sex assignment in children who lack capacity. Here, there is a particularly great risk of insufficient respect being accorded to the child's (future) self-determination and its physical integrity...

Decisions on sex assignment interventions are to be guided by the questions of what genitalia a child actually requires at a given age (apart from a functional urinary system) and how these interventions will affect the physical and mental health of the child and the future adult. Treatment needs to be carefully justified, especially since – in functional, aesthetic and psychological respects – surgically altered genitalia ... are not comparable to natural male or female genitalia. Decisions are to be guided, above all, by the child's welfare...

The harmful consequences may include, for example, loss of fertility and sexual sensitivity, chronic pain, or pain associated with dilation (bougienage) of a surgically created vagina, with traumatizing effects for the child. If such interventions are performed solely with a view to integration of the child into its family and social environment, then they run counter to the child's welfare. In addition, there is no guarantee that the intended purpose (integration) will be achieved.

— Swiss National Advisory Commission on Biomedical Ethics

The report is notable for making a clear apology for damage done to intersex people in the past, and up until the present. It recommends deferring all "non-trivial" surgeries which have "irreversible consequences". The report also recommended criminal sanction for non-medically necessary genital surgeries.

=== Senate Committee inquiry, Australia, 2013 ===
In October 2013, the Australian Senate published a report entitled Involuntary or coerced sterilisation of intersex people in Australia. The Senate found that "normalising" surgeries are taking place in Australia, often on infants and young children, with preconceptions that it described as "disturbing": "Normalising appearance goes hand in hand with the stigmatisation of difference".

They commented: "...normalisation surgery is more than physical reconstruction. The surgery is intended to deconstruct an intersex physiology and, in turn, construct an identity that conforms with stereotypical male and female gender categories" and: "Enormous effort has gone into assigning and 'normalising' sex: none has gone into asking whether this is necessary or beneficial. Given the extremely complex and risky medical treatments that are sometimes involved, this appears extremely unfortunate."

The report makes 15 recommendations, including ending cosmetic genital surgeries on infants and children and providing for legal oversight of individual cases.

Organisation Intersex International Australia welcomed the report, saying that,

At a first view, many of the headline conclusions and recommendations are positive – accepting our recommendations on minimising genital surgery, concern over the lack of adequate data, insufficient psychosocial support, and concern that decision making on cancer risk is insufficiently disentangled from wider concerns about a person's intersex status itself; we also broadly welcome the recommendations relating to the prenatal use of Dexamethasone ... The distinction between therapeutic and non-therapeutic treatment has failed many intersex people in Australia. We welcome the recommendation for the proper oversight of individual cases.

— Organisation Intersex International Australia

== Reports by human rights NGOs ==
=== Amnesty International report on Denmark and Germany, 2017 ===
In 2017, Amnesty International published a report condemning "non-emergency, invasive and irreversible medical treatment with harmful effects" on children born with variations of sex characteristics in Germany and Denmark. It found that surgeries take place with limited psychosocial support, based on gender stereotypes, but without firm evidence. Amnesty International reported that "there are no binding guidelines for the treatment of intersex children".

=== Human Rights Watch/interACT report on U.S. children, 2017 ===
In July 2017, Human Rights Watch and interACT published a report on medically unnecessary surgeries on intersex children, "I Want to Be Like Nature Made Me", based on interviews with intersex persons, families and physicians. The report states that:

Intersex people in the United States are subjected to medical practices that can inflict irreversible physical and psychological harm on them starting in infancy, harms that can last throughout their lives. Many of these procedures are done with the stated aim of making it easier for children to grow up "normal" and integrate more easily into society by helping them conform to a particular sex assignment. The results are often catastrophic, the supposed benefits are largely unproven, and there are generally no urgent health considerations at stake

The report found that intersex medical interventions persist as default advice from doctors to parents, despite some change in some regions of the U.S. and claims of improved surgical techniques, resulting in an uneven situation where care differs and a lack of standards of care, but paradigms for care are still based on socio-cultural factors including expectations of "normality" and evidence in support of surgeries remains lacking. "Nearly every parent" in the study reported pressure for their children to undergo surgery, and many reported misinformation. The report calls for a ban on "surgical procedures that seek to alter the gonads, genitals, or internal sex organs of children with atypical sex characteristics too young to participate in the decision, when those procedures both carry a meaningful risk of harm and can be safely deferred." The report was acknowledged as an important contribution to research by the American Academy of Pediatrics, Associated Press reported on the report and opposition to a ban by CARES Foundation.

== See also ==
- Intersex human rights
- Intersex medical interventions
- Discrimination against intersex people
- Legal recognition of intersex people
- Intersex infanticide
