= Association of the Russian Speaking Intersex =

Association of the Russian Speaking Intersex (ARSI)
- Ассоциация русскоязычных интерсекс людей
- Formation: August 2013; 13 years ago
- Region served: Russia
- Website: arsintersex.org

The Association of the Russian Speaking Intersex (ARSI) (Russian: Ассоциация русскоязычных интерсекс людей (АРСИ)) the first Russian intersex human rights organization. It is the unregistered non-governmental organization. It was founded in August 2013 by Aleksander Berezkin, a Russian intersex man, asylum seeker, and intersex human rights activist. The organization provides psychological and legal support to intersex people in Russia and other post-Soviet countries, provides lectures and seminars, and speaks in the media.

== Mission ==
The organization's mission is to improve the well-being of intersex-people in Eastern Europe and Central Asia: to raise awareness about intersex people, promote the full realization of their human rights, and provide informational, psychological, legal, and other types of support on intersex issues.

== History ==
The organization was founded in August 2013 by Aleksander Berezkin after consulting with Julia Pustovit, the first modern intersex advocate in Eastern Europe. Thus, it became the first intersex organization in Russia, not counting the forum intersex.su.

First organized as a closed information group in Facebook, ARSI has since recruited lawyers and other professionals.

Irene Kuzemko, another ARSI member, founded her own intersex human rights organization in 2017.

== Activities ==
=== 2021 ===
ARSI launched a portal for parents of intersex children.

=== 2020 ===
In 2020 ARSI and other 32 intersex human rights organizations around the world welcomed Austrian statement urging the authorities to investigate human rights violations and abuses against intersex people. Also they called on the UN Human Rights Council to take further action to protect the autonomy of intersex people.

ARSI lawyer and co-director Ilia Saveliev gave comments for Russian newspapers (Kommersant and Moskovskij Komsomolets) and BBC regarding laws applied in Russia that violates the rights of trans and intersex people.

ARSI members took part in first Russian Intersex Conference organized by "Interseks.ru" (Russian: "Интерсекс.ру")

=== 2019 ===
In March 2019, ARSI organized the round table "Intersex and the trans* movement: towards cooperation”, held in St. Petersburg.

In 2019 ARSI published a book "My intersex child: Manual for parents of intersex children" (Russian: Мой интерсекс-ребенок. Пособие для родителей с вариациями полового развития)

=== 2018 ===
In 2018 ARSI published several books: “Intersex people: questions and answers” (Russian: «Интерсекс люди: вопросы и ответы»), "“Beyond male and female: intersex people rights”, manual for lawyers" (Russian: «За пределами мужского и женского: права интерсексов», пособие для юристов), Russian translation of Georgiann Davis book "“Contesting intersex”"

== Selected bibliography ==
- "Мой интерсекс ребёнок" — пособие для родителей интерсекс детей (in Russian). ARSI. 2019.
- "Интерсекс люди: вопросы и ответы" (in Russian). ARSI. 2018.
- "За пределами мужского и женского: права интерсексов", пособие для юристов (in Russian). ARSI. 2018.
- "Споры об интерсексности" на русском (in Russian). ARSI. 2018.
