= Support Initiative for People with Congenital Disorders =

SIPD Uganda
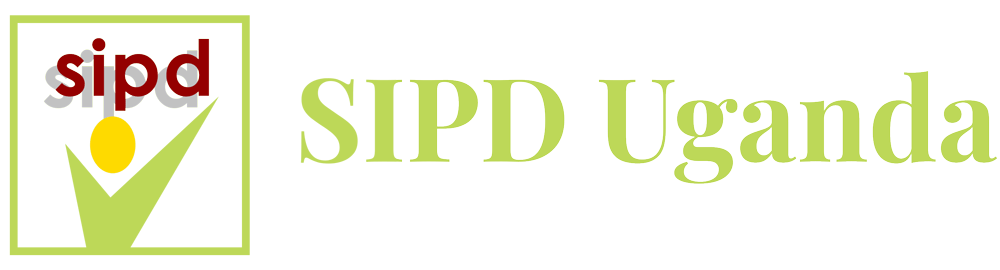
- Formation: 2008
- Founders: Julius Kaggwa
- Type: Nonprofit organization
- Headquarters: Ntinda – Bukoto Road Kampala, Uganda
- Website: https://sipdug.org/

The Support Initiative for People with Congenital Disorders (also referred to as the Support Initiative for People with Atypical Sex Development and shortened to SIPD or SIPD Uganda) is a nonprofit organization with the aim of raising awareness and education about the problems intersex people face and bringing about positive social change. The organization was founded in 2008 by intersex activist Julius Kaggwa in Kampala, Uganda.

== Objectives ==
The aim of SIPD is to make the government, civil society, and general public more accepting of intersex people. The organization's objectives to achieve this goal include challenging superstitions around intersex people, using education and awareness efforts to reduce society-wide intersex exclusion, increasing availability and clarity of information about intersex conditions, and promoting human rights of intersex children through community change.

Instead of intersex medical interventions, SIPD promotes a nonsurgical approach to raising intersex children by taking a "best guess" approach to the child's gender. The child will be raised as that presumed gender until they are old enough to participate in medical decisions.

== Initiatives ==
In 2015, SIPD performed the Baseline Survey On Intersex Realties in East Africa to identify essential indicators to capture in describing the current context of the lives of intersex people and the state of organizing intersex communities in Uganda, Kenya, and Rwanda. By 2017, SIPD assisted over 1,400 people in Uganda. SIPD provides emotional support and skills training for intersex people. SIPD has supported the development of other organizations in Africa as well, including the Intersex Persons Society of Kenya.

On September 14, 2024, SIPD met with the Human Rights Awareness and Promotion Forum as well as the Uganda Human Rights Commission to discuss human rights violations against LGBTQI+ people.
