= Julius Kaggwa =

Ugandan intersex activist

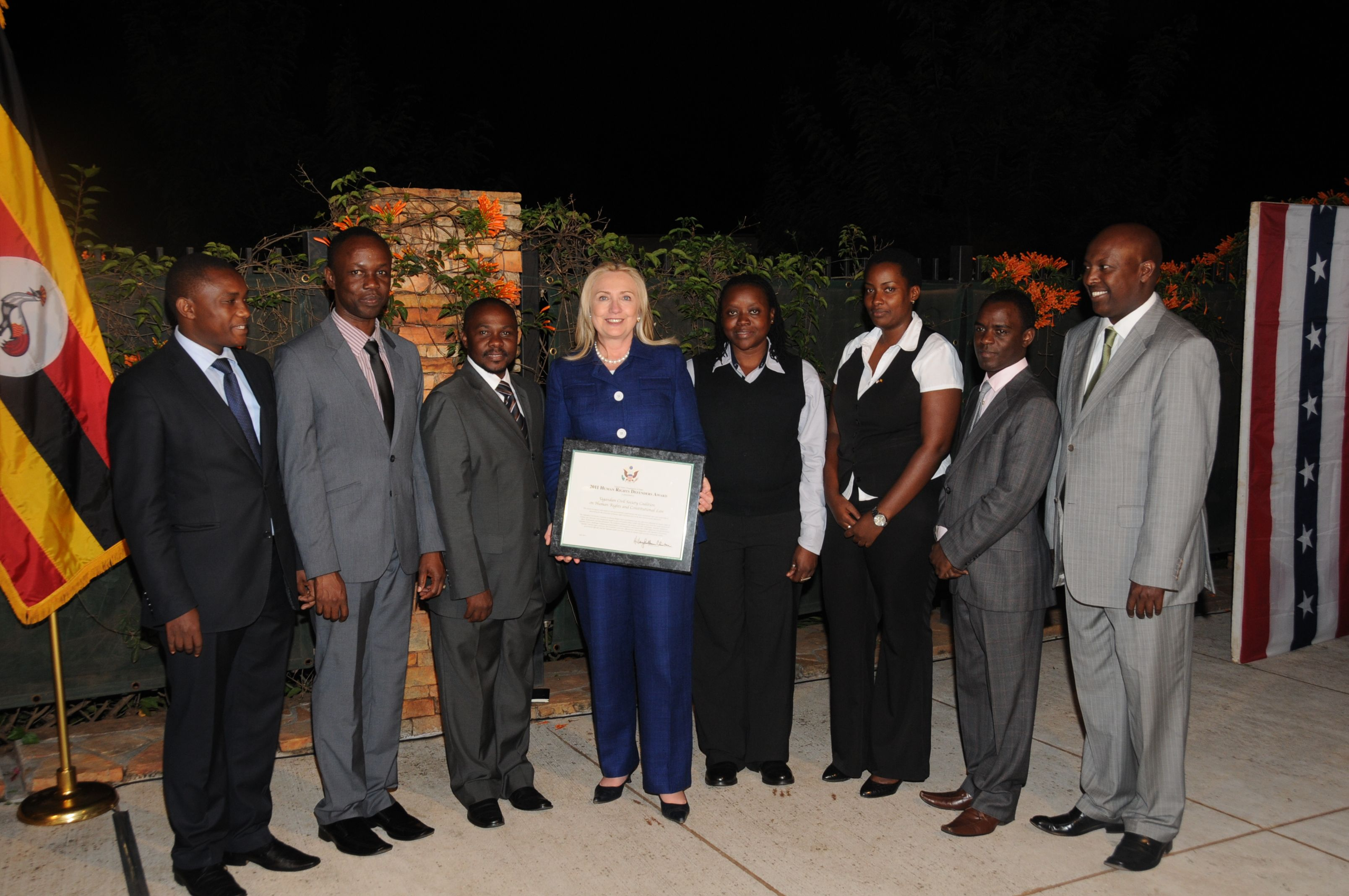
- U.S. Secretary of State Hillary Rodham Clinton poses for a photo with recipients of the U.S. State Department’s 2011 Human Rights Defender Award including Julius Kaggwa in Kampala, Uganda on August 3, 2012.
- Born: Uganda
- Occupation: Executive Director of Support Initiative for People with atypical sex Development
- Known for: Intersex and transgender activist
- Website: sipduganda.org

Julius Kaggwa is a prominent Ugandan intersex and transgender activist and executive director of intersex support organization Support Initiative for People with atypical sex Development (SIPD). In 2010, Kaggwa was a joint winner of the Human Rights First Human Rights Award. The following year, he was a joint winner of the Human Rights Defenders Award.

== Activism ==
Kaggwa campaigns on health, support and human rights issues facing intersex people, and also gender non-conforming people, and against the Ugandan "Anti-homosexuality" Bill.

Kaggwa has described how intersex infants may be mutilated or terminated due to the stigma surrounding their birth, and mothers may be stigmatized. SIPD aims to change cultural attitudes, and support appropriate medical care. Intersex conditions are viewed as a medical issue, in contrast to homosexuality, but as a committed Christian, Kaggwa argues that violence and discrimination against LGBT people is incompatible with his faith. In 2016, Kaggwa described how increasing discrimination against LGBT people in Uganda has contributed to a lack of safety for intersex people.

== Awards and recognition ==
In 2010, Kaggwa was a joint winner of the Human Rights First 2010 Human Rights Award for his work leading the fight against an anti-homosexuality bill in Uganda, and helping to create a more tolerant environment for sexual minorities.

As a member of Uganda's Civil Society Coalition on Human Rights and Constitutional Law, Kaggwa was a joint winner in the Human Rights Defenders Award, 2011.

== Selected bibliography ==
- Kaggwa, Julius (October 9, 2016). "Understanding intersex stigma in Uganda". Intersex Day.
- Kaggwa, Julius (2016-09-16). "I'm an intersex Ugandan – life has never felt more dangerous". The Guardian. ISSN 0261-3077.
- Kaggwa, Julius (August 24, 2012). "Life's No Play, But Certain Characters' Voices Are Heard Loud and Clear in Uganda". The Huffington Post. The World Post.
- Kaggwa, Julius (April 18, 2010). "Ugandan Anti-Homosexuality Bill Doubly Endangers LGBT Community and Human Rights Activists". The Huffington Post. The World Post.
