= Vulva activism =

Feminist movement

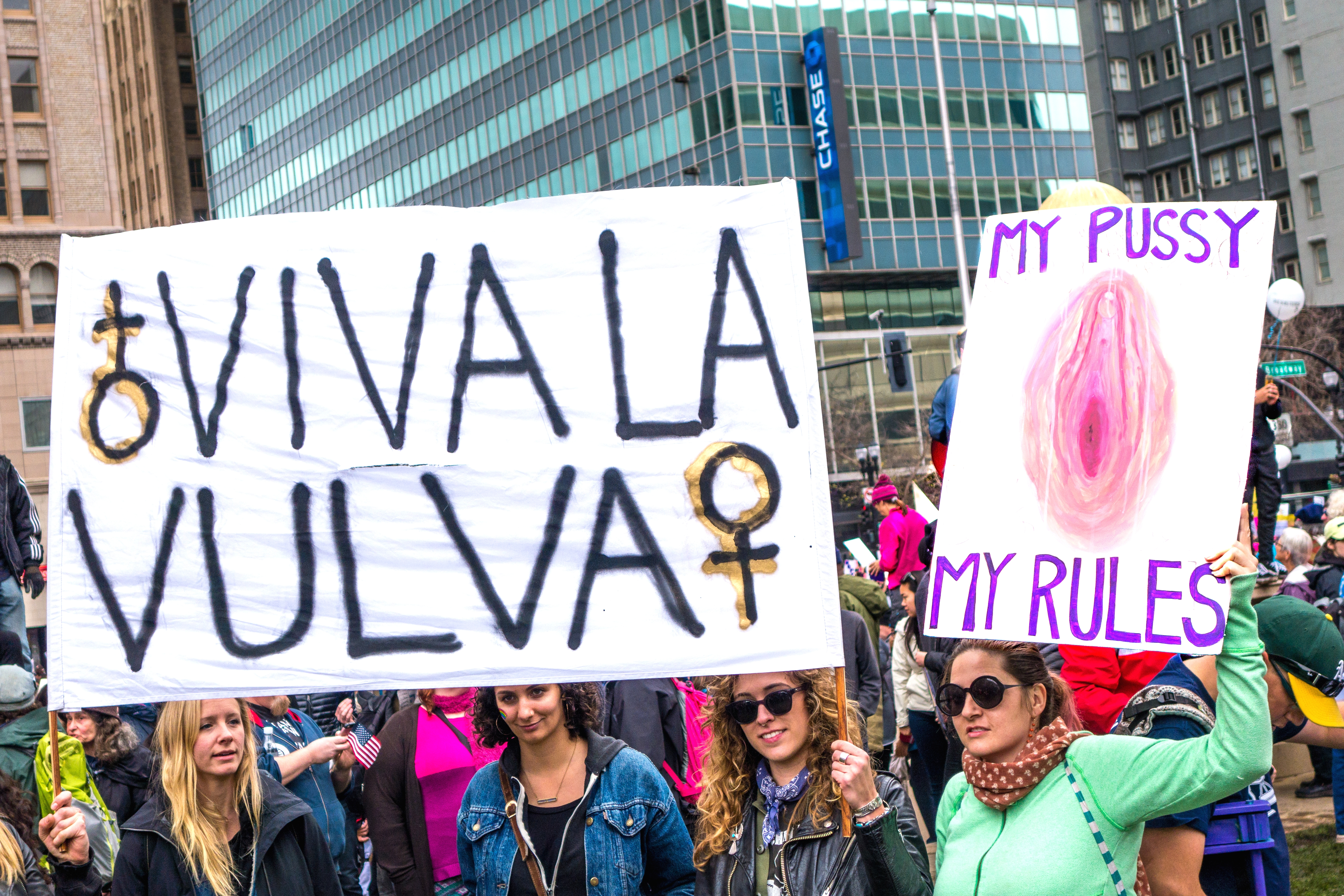
Raising awareness for the vulva at the Women's March in Oakland, 2017

Vulva activism (also termed as vulvactivism) is the promotion of a raised awareness of the appearance of female genitalia and the breaking of taboos surrounding the vulva, as carried out by feminist movements and advocacy groups. Other names for this advocacy movement are labia pride, labia liberation, vulvaversity, viva la vulva, pussy positivity and similar. It is supported by several independent feminist groups and based on diverse channels of communication such as cyberfeminism, protest marches and advocating boycotts against physicians and clinics that make use of deceptive advertising.

== Background ==
While the men's penis often serves as a symbol of virility and prowess, the vulva is associated with contradictory and often negative evaluations and meanings in western society. It is strongly sexualized as the object of erotic desire, but it is also often regarded as ugly, disgusting and unclean: something to be ashamed of and hide. Unveiling or talking about the vulva are considered obscene, offensive and taboo in most situations. The term vulva shaming is sometimes used for these phenomena. There are many stigmatizations and myths concerning the vulva. Many girls and women are insecure about the appearance of their genitals, but do not dare to bring up the topic with family and friends.

The anthropologist Carlos Sulkin depicts this connection as a culturally associative network, whereby the tabooing of the vulva and problematic ideals of beauty are closely linked. There is a cultural norm in Western societies to keep the vulva covered and concealed in public, to hide it and avoid it as a topic. In this context, unrealistic ideas of perfection and normativity thrive:

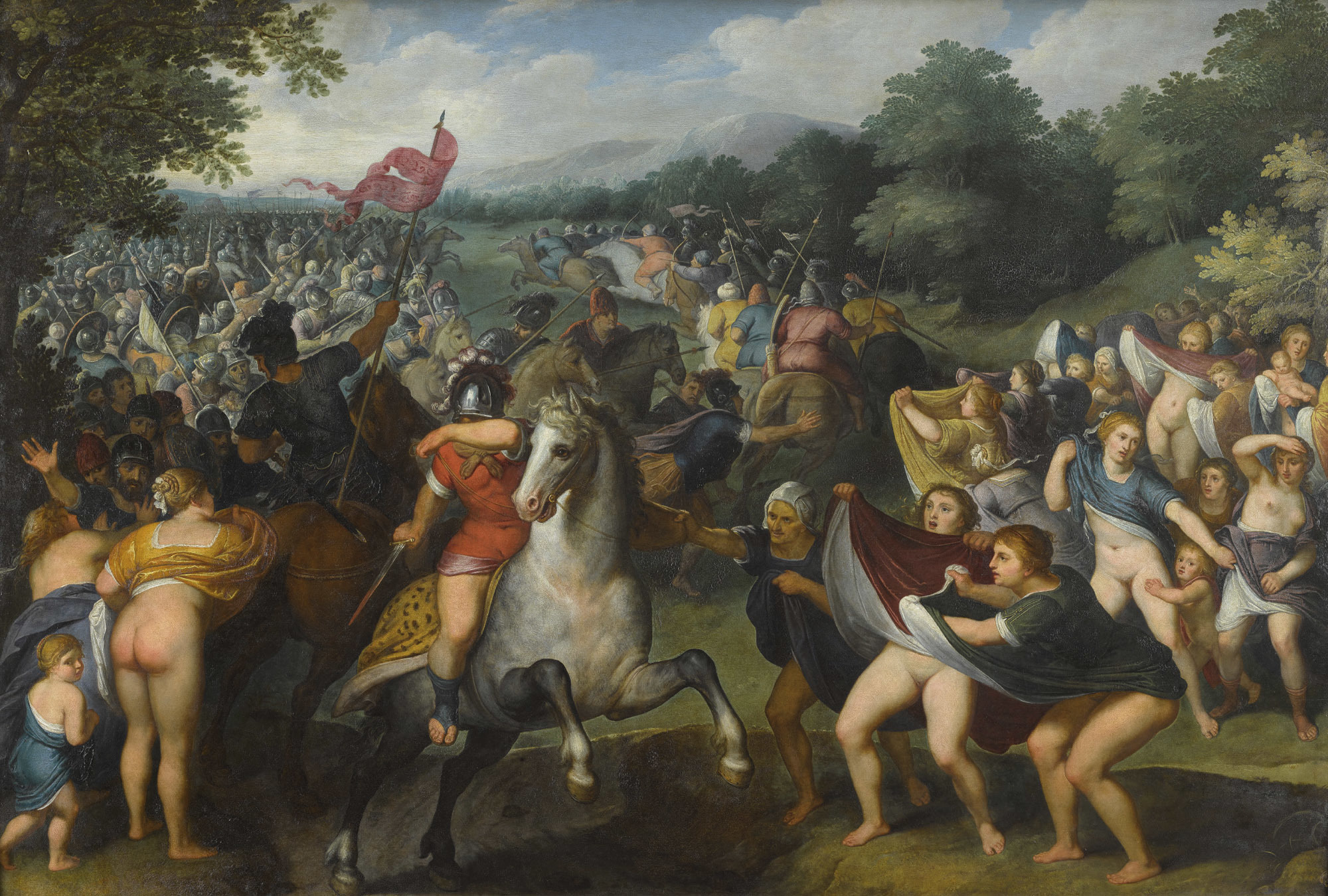
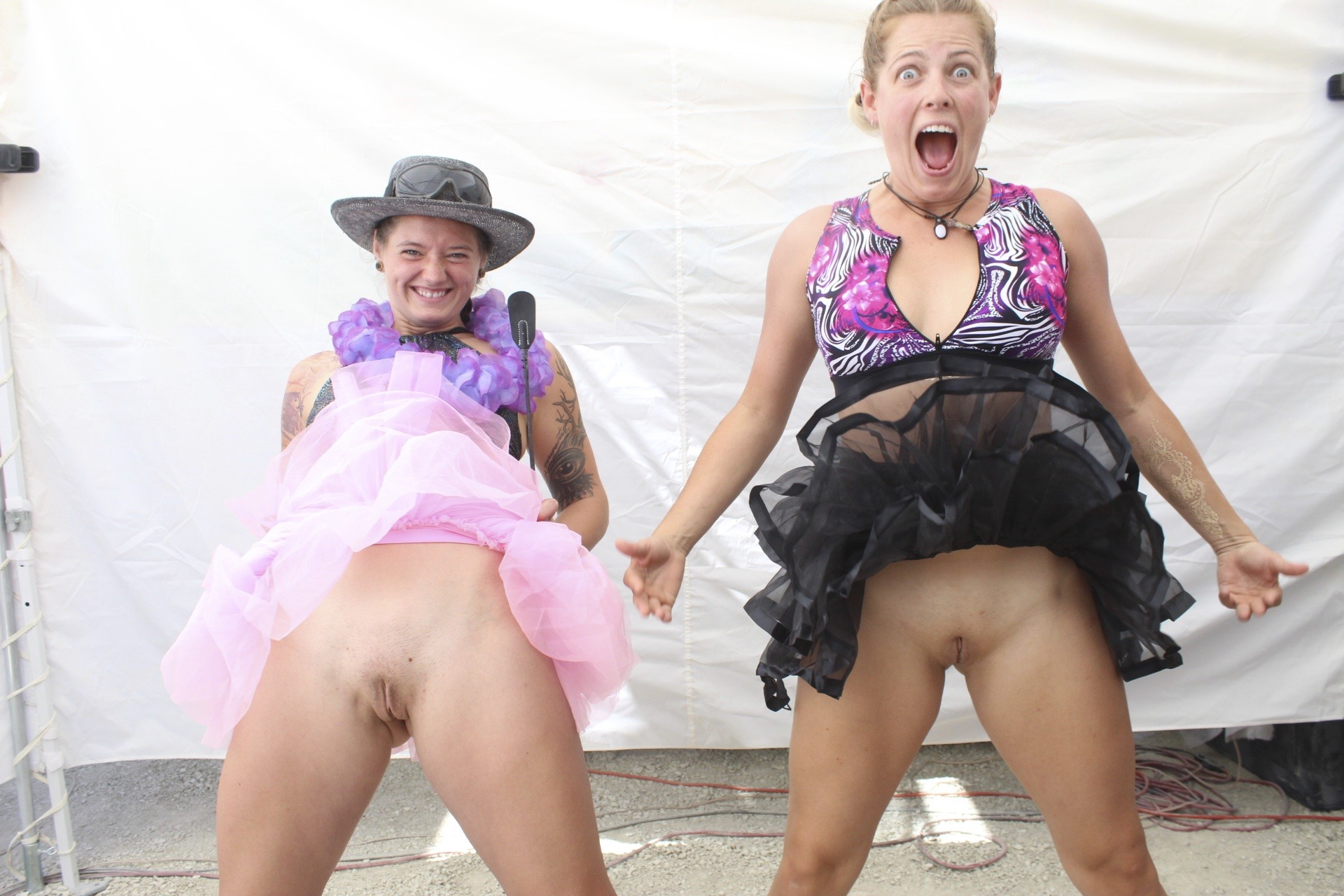
Painting The Persian women, by Otto van Veen from the year 1629 (above) and a 21st century feminist art project (below)

Take the term "vulva". It means whatever it means to each one of us because of the association we make between it and other terms, concepts, images, and narratives for or about genitals, the body, sex, sexuality, beauty, pleasure, modesty, and so on, as well as with our personal experiences with and memories of genitals. We pick up such terms, make these associations, and come to believe in the accounts of the world within which our understandings of vulvas make sense, in part, because these terms and associations are bandied about by people around us, from our childhoods onward. We pick them up as we pick up language. We share so many associations with our consociates that we seem to be able to understand what others mean, understand, and intend when they speak or act in a certain way regarding vulvas.
For instance, in much of the English-speaking world, with few exceptions, we sense that vulvas and their surroundings should be kept from the sight of others in everyday life, and we dress and comport ourselves and speak in ways that take this for granted. As children, we picked this up and thereafter reproduced these associations and sense. [...]
It is also a world in which the looks of vulvas are very much on the horizon of concern, with some women endowed with pretty slits while others have "ghastly" protruding bits.

— Carlos Sulkin, University of Regina

Many cultures, however, also have the opposite tendency to identify the vulva with powerful, mythical forces. This valuation of the vulva is found for both ancient European and non-European cultures. In these mythologies, for example, the belief prevails that disaster can be averted through the self-determined uncovering of the vulva, referred to as Anasyrma. This practice was used both in religious rituals, but was practiced in the context of secular festivals. Public exposure of the vulva became an act of empowerment.

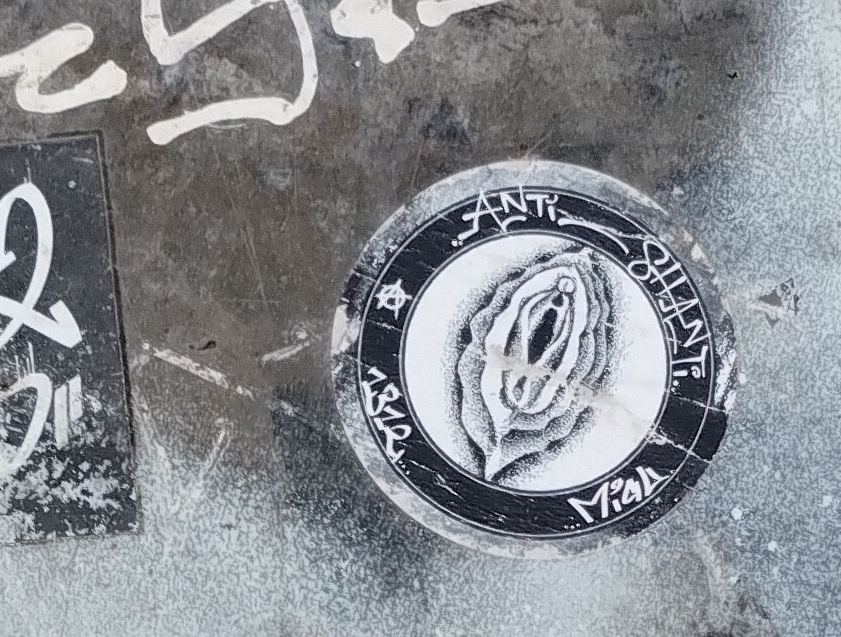
Sticker with artistic depiction of a vulva

Anasyrma has inspired modern feminist activists and has been incorporated in art projects and workshops such as Raising the Skirt and Anasyrma Army. The activists argue that the taboos and shame that affect the vulva in Western society are to be conquered and women are to find a relaxed way of dealing with the vulva again.

== Aims and objectives ==
The campaigns are intended to educate, empower and raise critical awareness about natural genital variation. Activists and supporters encourage women (and also men) to develop more positive attitudes towards the vulva and to accept anatomical variations as they are. Campaigners believe that the vulva should be seen as a normal part of the body that does not need to be hidden and made taboo, and that women should embrace that part of their body and stop being ashamed of their vulva.

The aim is to educate about normal female anatomy and its variations and break taboos surrounding the vulva. To achieve this, the vulva is recontextualized, for example, through public display and discourse in explicitly non-sexual contexts.

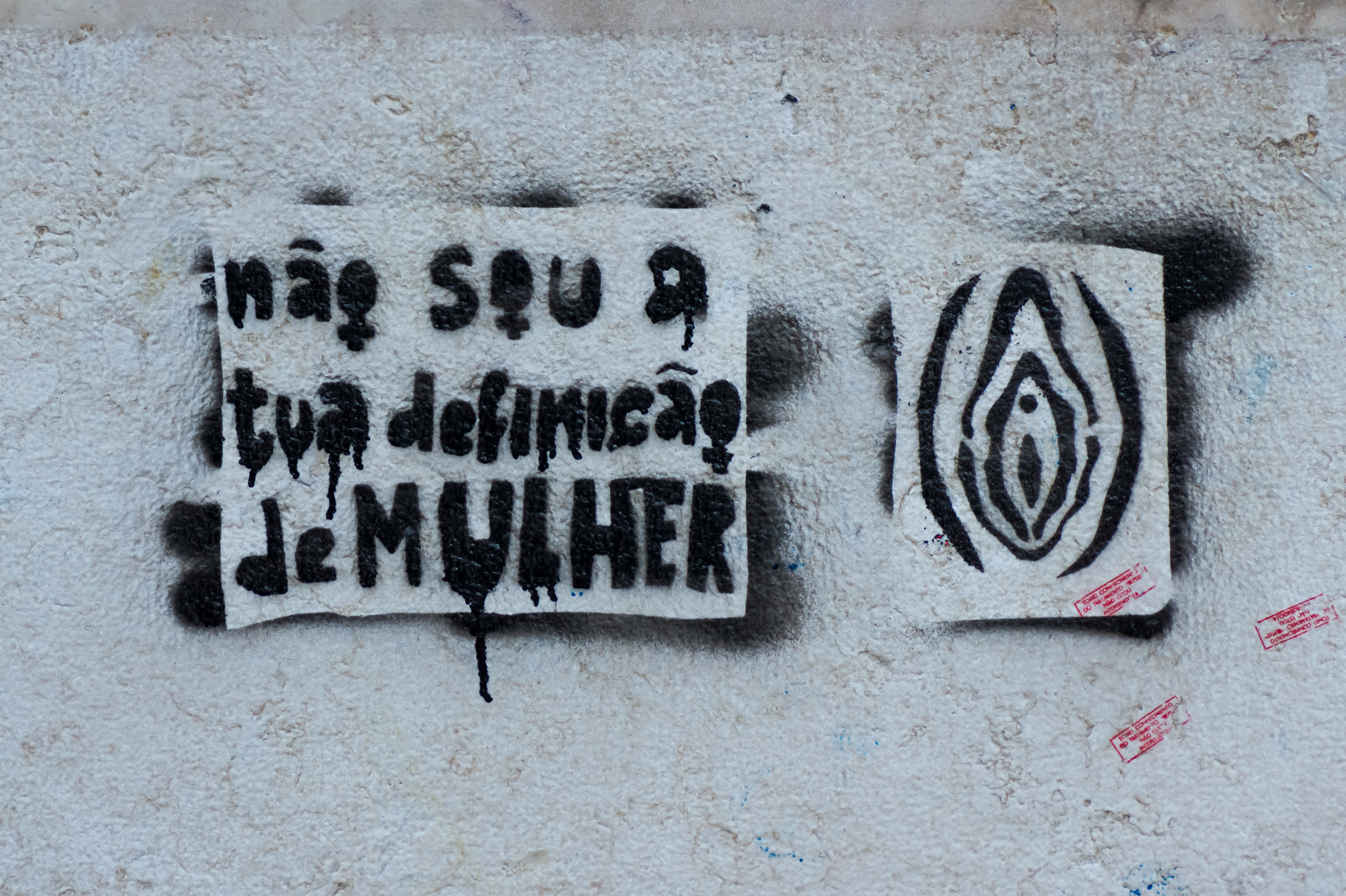
Stencil in Lisbon depicting a vulva captioned with the Portuguese for "You do not define me as a woman"

=== Ending vulva shaming ===
Although the vulva is still a taboo in today's society, it is subject to an unrealistic ideal of beauty. Unlike most other parts of the body, the vulva is usually covered in public and hidden from the gaze of others, as expressed in the term "private parts". Most heterosexual girls and women rarely see other vulvas besides their own. Male adolescents are often familiar with the appearance of vulvas only through pornographic images. Thus, for many people of both sexes, there are no realistic standards or possibilities for comparison.

Taken together, these are the conditions for which many women:

- have a negative self-perception of their vulva and feel they have to be ashamed of it, and
- for which unrealistic beauty standards develop. While such ideals exist for numerous body regions, most of which are also far from average, there is little or no opportunity to correct or relativize these standards through social comparison.

=== Addressing unrealistic beauty standards ===
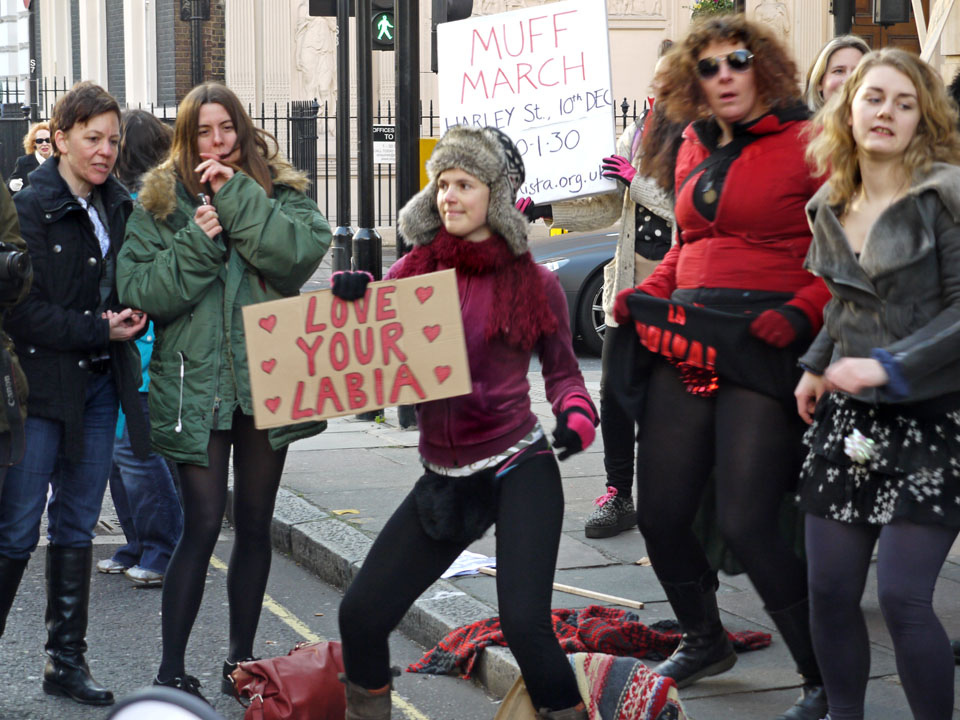
A woman holding a sign saying "Love your labia" at the Muff March in London, 2011

The growing demand for labiaplasty surgery could be attributed to the fact that many women, as well as men, have unrealistic expectations regarding genital appearance. The cultural norm of covering the genitals in public creates a lack of a standard of comparison. Most explicit depictions of female genitalia that people are confronted with are produced by the sex industry. Pornography is usually produced in a commercial context and primarily addresses male customers. Therefore, these depictions of female genitalia are often "beautified" to suit commercial need (or in some countries for legal reasons), either by the selection of models with a certain anatomy or by photoshopping the images. In practice, this means smoothing out irregularities and "digitally shortening" the labia minora.

A whole generation of young women who have grown up with ready access to the Internet are learning about their bodies and sexuality through this medium...Often the first and only way girls get to have a good look at other girls' naked genitals is through pornography, [which gives] a false view of what real women look like.

— Madeleine Davies

A 2020 study of 4,513 Canadian men and women directly addressed the question of what aesthetic preferences both sexes have regarding the vulva. For this purpose, photos of vulvas with and without labiaplasty were shown, and the participants were asked to rate them on the dimensions personal ideal (what they themselves consider ideal), societal ideal (what they think most other people consider to be ideal) and normalcy (how far does the depicted vulva correspond to the natural average). It was found that both men and women considered the vulvas after labiaplasty not only more attractive i.e. ideal (both societal and personal), but also more normal. This effect was even more pronounced for women than for men. Thus, vulvas with surgically removed or reduced labia minora were considered more normal than natural vulvas by most people. The authors conclude that:

The continuing repression of female sexuality, wherein direct exposure to female genitalia may elicit a sense of impropriety or disgust, and the resulting censorship of untucked labia in media, may contribute to the perceived normalcy of the more tucked in or invisible labial appearance.

— Skoda et al. 2020

A 2022 study using a similar methodology found natural, unaltered vulvas, when compared to vulvas that had undergone labiaplasty, to be rated as less normal and ideal, and to be considered disgusting. Of note, this effect is moderated by race and most pronounced for pre-operative white vulvas and post-operative black vulvas. While, as expected, heterosexual men rate vulvas as more attractive than homosexual men, and heterosexual women rate vulvas as less attractive than lesbian women, the same pattern emerges here. A study conducted in Germany yielded similar findings, showing that naturally developed inner labia are considered to be ugly, disgusting, and a deformity that should ideally be surgically removed.

The taboo and shameful public attitude towards the vulva is seen as the cause of these unrealistic expectations. Various initiatives aim to change this and want the vulva to be treated in public presentation and conversation as a normal body part. Demands include that female genitalia be allowed to be depicted in the popular press without the legal requirement of "photoshopping" the labia away, as is the case in Australia, that parents use the anatomically correct terms in conversation with their children, and that children's dolls such as Barbie not be shipped without vulvas. ("Barbie style" is a common term for an extensive form of labiaplasty in which the labia minora are completely removed.)

== Forms of activism ==
=== Muff March ===
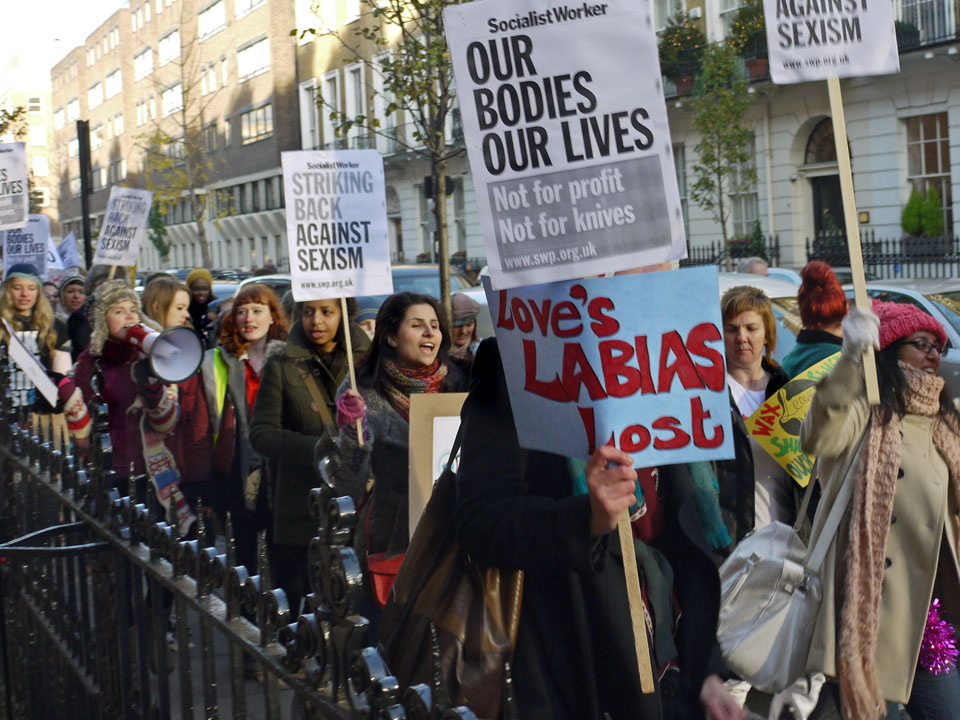
Protest for Labia awareness: Muff March in London, 2011

The London-based feminist group UK Feminista organized a protest march through Harley Street, an area synonymous with its private medical providers, in December 2011. More than 320 women paraded the street, with slogans like: "Keep your mits off our bits!", "There's nothing finer than my vagina!", and "Harley Street puts my chuff in a huff"

Muff March is about speaking back to a pornified culture which is pressuring women to go under the surgeon's knife and get a "designer vagina". We also want to shine a spotlight on the cosmetic surgeons who ruthlessly mine women's bodies to extract maximum profit.[...] Now pornography is exposing women to the toxic myth that there is one "right" way for their labia to look. It's time to fight back.

— Kat Banyard, Director of UK Feminista

The "Muff March" has been criticized for putting too much emphasis on pornography as a root cause of the problem. (See Feminist views on pornography.)

=== New View campaign ===
New View is a New York City based, grassroots network of feminists, social scientists and health care providers. In a self-description, New View "is opposed to the growth of the unregulated and unmonitored genital cosmetic surgery industry that is medicalizing women's sexuality and creating new risks, norms and insecurities." The group initiated several events with the aim of empowering women and raising awareness for the topic under names such as the Vulvagraphics or Vulvanomics. These include workshops to "celebrate the role of art in activism and to kick off a campus-based movement to celebrate genital diversity", "flash activism" in front of surgeon's offices, conferences (Framing the Vulva) and street demonstrations.

=== Labia Pride ===
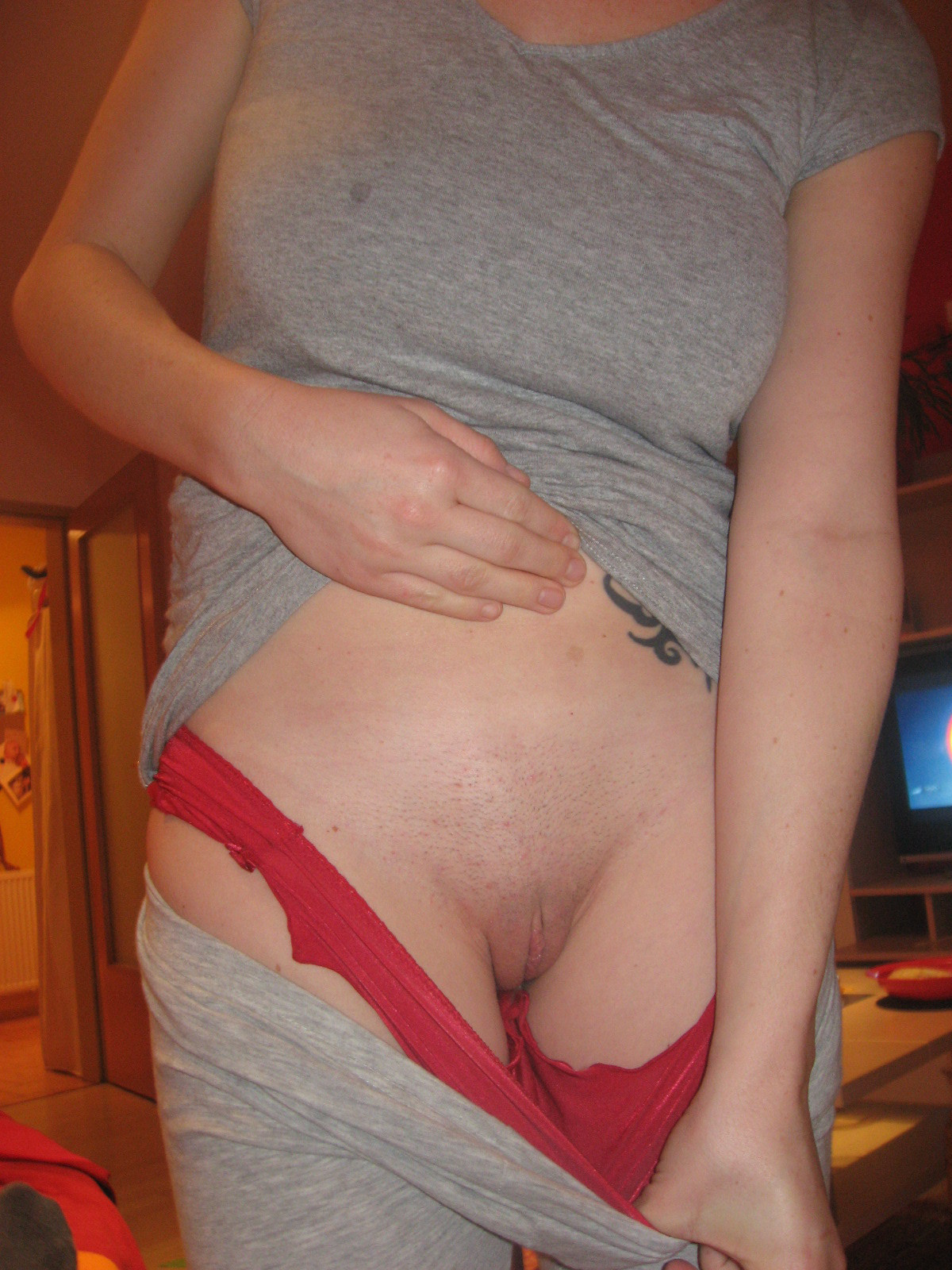
Women post photographs of their vulvas "to publicly catalog normal genital diversity" and "counter unrealistic standards"

The name emphasizes the labia, as the trend towards cosmetic surgery on the female genitals (labiaplasty, also known as "designer vagina") has left many women insecure about the size and appearance of their labia.

Several feminist groups, such as Gynodiversity, the Large Labia Project, or 100 vulvas try to oppose the influence that pornography has on anatomic expectations. By encouraging women to release images of their vulvas and post photo submissions of anonymous vulvas on their websites, they want to establish a sphere for women to get realistic impressions of normal vulvas.

The campaign has faced criticisms over putting too much blame on the porn industry and the subjection to male desires, and ignoring the fact that many women have naturally small labia. The campaign has been criticized for giving the false impression that protruding labia are the anatomical norm and small inner labia are the adaptation to beauty standards:

In an effort to make "real women" feel better about themselves, some labia proud ladies are taking shots at girls whose labia actually look like the imaginary "Barbie" ideal. Turns out, some girls are actually born like that. Labia, like boobs or entire bodies, come in all shapes, sizes, colors and textures. Shaming one to make another type feel better is bad news. Think of it in terms of thin women who are often shamed or shunned in support of body image advocacy for larger girls.

— Jessica Sager

=== Courageous Cunts ===
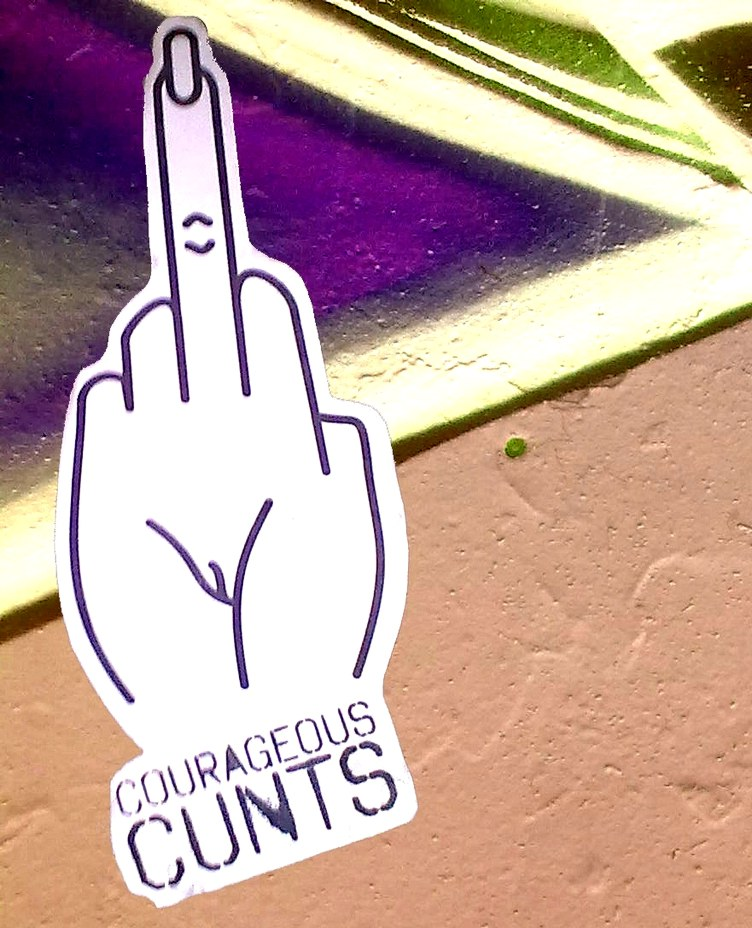
Flyposting of the activist platform Courageous Cunts on an urban wall

Courageous Cunts was a feminist website, founded in 2012, that focused on issues of body empowerment and genital self-awareness. Its primary concerns were the critical reception of women's health issues, sexualized body images, and the sexual objectification of female bodies. Courageous Cunts considered itself to be part of the labia pride movement, with the aim of raising awareness for critical issues around labiaplasty and empowering women to overcome body shame. The site ran a campaign during which women could publicly post photographs of their vulvas to promote a natural genital image and protest against "porn aesthetics". Using the word "cunt" as their name was an act of reappropriation, as English professor Germaine Greer argues that the ancient vulgarism "is one of the few remaining words in the English language with a genuine power to shock".

=== Vulvaversity ===
Vulvaversity is a collective of committed artists and project makers originating in the German city of Freiburg im Breisgau. The project is dedicated to demystifying the vulva and making it visible. The project clears up ideas of norms and wants to encourage people to overcome the shame regarding vulvas that has developed over many centuries. Vulvaversity wants to dispel the myth of the vulva as it is portrayed in mainstream pornography in particular. As a vehicle for this visualization, Vulvaversity produced calendars, notepads, shopping lists, and postcards. Vulvaversity deliberately refrains from aestheticizing or artistically depicting the photographed vulvas and thus shows unadulterated, unchanged images. The collective organizes film and discussion evenings, rooms for exchange, lectures and talks, and always provides the possibility to have a photo of one's own vulva taken in a mobile photo studio to have it published.

== See also ==
- Labia stretching – on the desirability of larger labia
- Intactivism – anti-circumcision activism

=== Art projects ===
- 101 Vagina, an Australian photo-book self-published in 2013
- Femalia, an American photo-book edited by Joani Blank and first published by Down There Press in 1993
- Jamie McCartney, a British artist best known for his work Great Wall of Vagina
- Megumi Igarashi, a Japanese artist who made a kayak out of a model of her vulva
- The Cunt Coloring Book by Tee Corinne. An adult themed coloring book of various vulvas.
- The Dinner Party, an installation by Judy Chicago
- Vagina and vulva in art (and also Clitoris § Contemporary art and Erotic art)

=== Protests ===
- Femen
- LABIA
- Nudity and protest
- One Billion Rising
- Pussyhat
