= Jill Posener =

British photographer and playwright (born 1953)

- Born: 1953 (age 72–73); Greenwich, County of London, England
- Education: LAMDA
- Occupations: Photographer, playwright
- Website: jillposener.com

Jill Posener (born 1953) is a British photographer and playwright, known for her exploration of lesbian identity and erotica.

== Early life and education ==
Posener was born in Greenwich, London, in the United Kingdom. She was educated as a stage manager at the London Academy of Music and Dramatic Art. Posener's brother is the journalist Alan Posener.

== Work ==
In 1976, Posener became the first female member of the Gay Sweatshop, England's first professional gay theatre company, for which she authored the play, Any Woman Can. The show was a reflection on Posener's own experience coming out as a lesbian, was the first female-authored play to be produced by the company.

In the 1980s, Posener switched mediums, taking up photography. Her images of graffiti with political, feminist, lesbian, and anti-consumerist themes were collected in two books, Spray it Loud (1982) and Louder than Words (1987). With time, her work shifted to address more overtly erotic and sexual themes. In 1988 and 1989, Posener became photo editor of the lesbian erotica magazine On Our Backs, known for its influence in shaping the aesthetic and narrative of U.S. lesbian culture in the 1980s.

In 1996, Posener collaborated with feminist author Susie Bright to publish Nothing but the Girl: The Blatant Lesbian Image, a landmark collection of lesbian erotic photography. The portfolio, which drew on Posener and Bright's work at On Our Backs, featured 30 interviews and photographs from influential lesbian and photographers. Nothing but the Girl was the recipient of the 1997 Lambda Literary Award for Photography/Visual Arts, and the 1997 Firecracker Alternative Book Award.

Her work has appeared in publications including the New York Times Book Review and the Daily Mirror, and on the covers of books by Dorothy Allison and Susie Bright. She has lectured at CalArts and the University of California, Santa Cruz.

== Themes and critical reception ==
=== Theatre ===
Any Woman Can is considered an important milestone in queer theatre, representing the 'beginning of lesbian theatre,' and part of the 'growing lesbian canon.' As the first play about lesbians produced by a gay male company, it both acknowledged the lesbian experience as an equally authentic part of homosexual identity, while representing of 'fragile alliances' between the lesbian an gay communities at large.' According to critic John Deeney, it represented then-popular positions ""that the personal is political" and that coming out is a necessary politicization of the self."

The political value of Any Woman Can may have been stronger than its theatrical value: it was initially rejected by Gay Sweatshop for 'lacking theatrical tension,' and has since been described as "didactic or agit-prop." Following the production of Any Woman Can, Posener herself rejected the identity of playwright, stating that the stage was merely the most readily available tool to honestly communicate the lesbian lived experience, and challenge "lesbian oppression" as part of the broader "oppression of women."

=== Photography ===
Posener's photographic work is considered part of a 'post-Stonewall' era of increased visibility of LGBTQ artists and public identity. Many artists working in this period have produced 'consciously political' works referencing and challenging heteronormative models of gender, sexuality, and expression. Posener's work explores many of these themes, utilizing photography as a form of critical commentary and exploration of identity and representation. Posener's series, "Dirty Girls in London" (1988), which portrayed women making out in public, was described as "passionate and blatant" by critic Elizabeth Ashburn.

Posener's subjects are often female nudes, often in overtly erotic contexts or engaged in sexual activity. The editorial aesthetic for On Our Backs and in Nothing But the Girl was characterized as "somewhat raw, sometimes transgressive, and often confrontational" by photographer, author, and critic Tee A. Corinne. Both Posener and Corinne have contributed to Femalia, a book of photographs of female genitalia edited by Joani Blank. Posener has described her own work as a form of political action, for rendering lesbian sexuality visible in public. Posener has summarized her call for confrontational representation with the statement, "If we don't take public spaces, nobody will hear us."

== Awards and honors ==
- 1997 Lambda Literary Award for Photography/Visual Arts
- 1997 Firecracker Alternative Book Award
