= Labia stretching =

Act of lengthening the labia minora

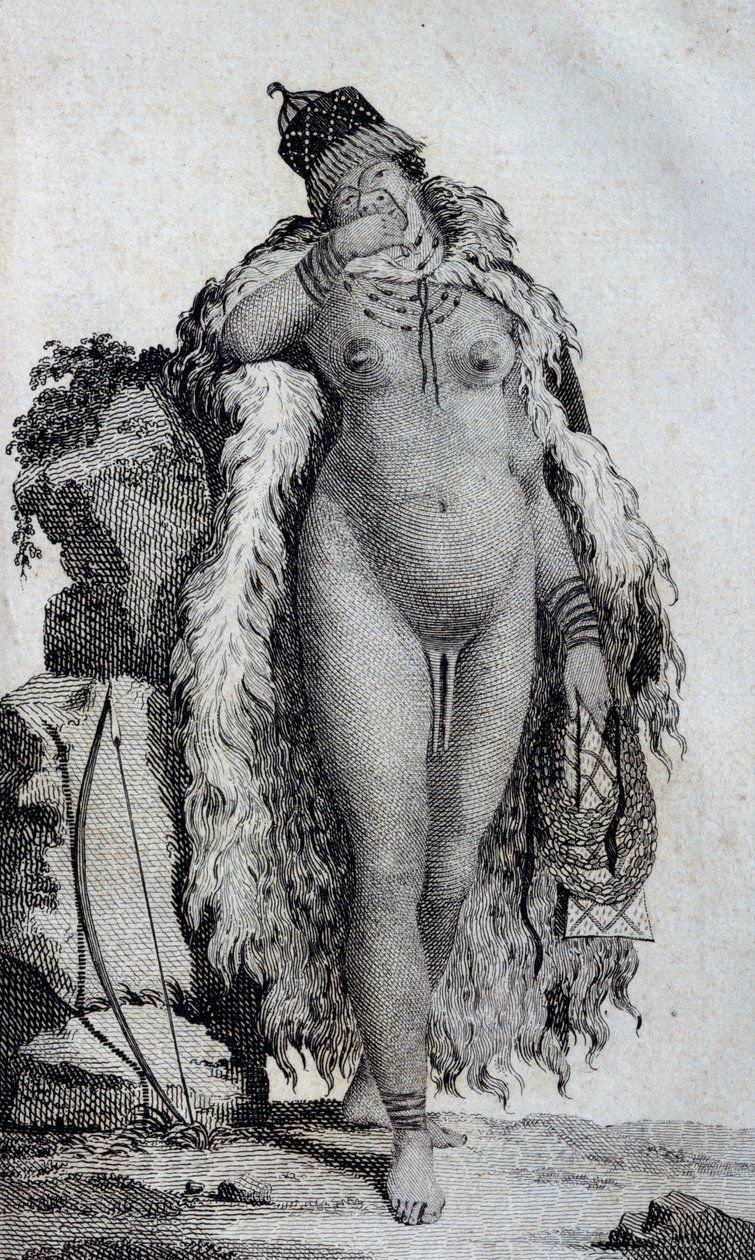
Khoikhoi woman, drawing from the "Travels of Le Vaillant", 1783

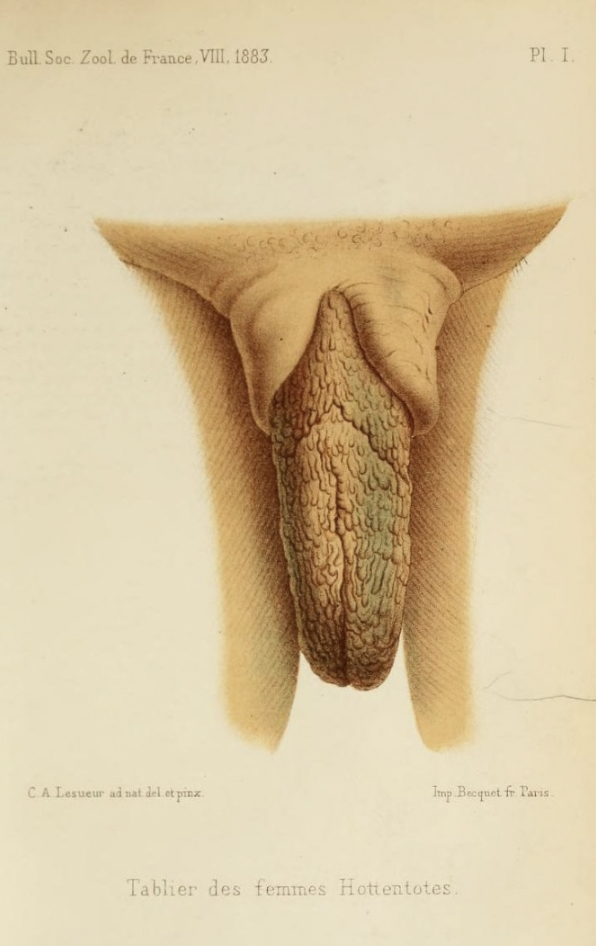
Closeup of enlarged labia, standing

Labia stretching, also referred to as labia elongation or labia pulling, is the act of lengthening the labia minora (the inner lips of the female genitals) through manual manipulation (pulling) or physical equipment (such as weights). It is a familial cultural practice in parts of Eastern and Southern Africa, and a body modification practice elsewhere. It can lead to elongated labia (also known as sinus pudoris or macronympha, and colloquially as khoikhoi apron), a feature of certain Khoekhoe women who, whether naturally or through artificial stretching, have relatively elongated labia minora. It is performed for sexual enhancement for the benefit of both partners, aesthetics, symmetry and gratification.

The labia and the whole vulva differ in size, shape, and colour from one person to another. In that labia stretching is attempting to change this body part to fit an ideal, and that it is often done by older women to girls, it has been compared to female genital mutilation (FGM) and child abuse.

== Benefits, drawbacks, and medical issues ==
Elongated labia are perceived to facilitate orgasm and female ejaculation, and are considered to enhance sexual pleasure for both partners. Women who have unequally long labia may increase the size of the shorter to achieve symmetry. They also swell inwards, partially blocking the entrance to the vagina.

Labia stretching can lead to vaginal sores that increase the risk of HIV infection.

One review concluded:

... that pain at the beginning of the practice, nuisances related to the use of caustic herbs, and stigmatization in failing to comply with the practice are the principal health risks associated with LME [labia minora elongation]. At the same time, there is evidence that labial elongation may benefit the sexual health and well-being of women.

The opposite of labia stretching is labia reduction or labiaplasty, which is performed as a surgical procedure for women whose genitals cause them discomfort or pain, or for aesthetic reasons.

== Controversy and legality ==
Although the World Health Organization previously included labial stretching within the context of "mutilation" (see Genital modification and mutilation), the negative context of that was not supported by the research of Marian Koster MSc and Dr. Lisa Price of Wageningen University, Netherlands. This led the WHO to schedule amending their treatment of it, perhaps as "modification" instead, in February 2008.

Some claim the practice of labial stretching does not violate women's rights because it does not involve physical violence, unless the woman is forcibly stretched or misled as to the benefits of the practice. However, it may be contrary to African customary law and rights of women if it is in conflict with public policy.

Girls usually start to stretch their labia from ages 8 to 14, before menarche. Children in the African diaspora practise this too, so it occurs within immigrant communities in, for example, Britain, where a BBC report labelled it a hidden form of child abuse. The girls are subject to familial and social pressure to conform.

== Historic context ==
The "apron" designation was apparently gained from the tendency of early European descriptions to misidentify the pair of labia as a single, wide organ, which they called, in French a tablier, or "apron".

The characteristics of this trait were known as early as the 1680s, the first European note on the subject being made by Anderson and Iverson, who visited the Cape of Good Hope in 1644, in relation to the Khoisan of that region, but became extensively documented in the late 18th and 19th century. The case of Sarah Baartman was significant. For many years, the identification of Baartman was questioned because she demonstrated this feature. Historically, elongated labia minora were said to be portrayed by a "Negro". So it is because of this trait that Baartman was considered to be part of the so-called "inferior race".

When Captain James Cook reached Cape Town in 1771, towards the end of his first voyage, he acknowledged being “very desirous to determine the great question among natural historians, whether the women of this country have or have not that fleshy flap or apron which has been called the sinus pudoris”; eventually a physician described treating patients with labia ranging from 1.3 to 7.6 or 10.2 centimetres (1/2 to 3 or 4 in) long.

In an obstetric textbook, Barton Cooke Hirst, the founder of the University of Pennsylvania Women’s Hospital wrote “In Hottentots the [labia minora] are uniformly enormous, projecting far beyond the labia majora. As an exception this condition is sometimes seen in the Caucasian race.”

In Eastern Africa, Monica Wilson recorded the custom through her fieldwork with the Nyakyusa people in the 1930s, and in Southern Africa Isaac Schapera worked with the Nama people, the largest group amongst the Khoikhoi, early in the 20th century, publishing The Khoisan Peoples of South Africa in 1930, in which he documents labia stretching. According to Schapera, some females were observed to exhibit elongated labia minora which sometimes projected as much as 10 cm below the vulva when standing. There was debate among these early anthropologists as to whether and in what circumstances such instances of elongated labia should be considered a physiological feature or the result of artificial manipulation.

== Rwanda ==
In Rwandan culture, female family members teach girls at puberty how to pull their labia to lengthen them (gukuna, "pull", imishino "labia" in Kinyarwanda language), using local medicinal flora to ease the process. Women continue the practice into adulthood and through marriage. The most important aspect of gukuna imishino, which may begin about the age of 10, is to assist the couple to perform the sexual practice of kunyaza, in which the sexual satisfaction of the woman comes before that of the man.

== Uganda ==
Labia elongation is something that every girl who has grown up on Ugandan terrain has at least heard about. Others have experienced it, complete with its joys and pains, while for many it is a mystery they can only imagine. Some men have heard of it too, and others have gone beyond the doors of these protected waters. Some people cherish it with their entire being, while others could not care at all about a matter so trivial. Another section of the community downrightly abhors elongated labia.

— Patience Akumu, The Observer (Uganda), 2010

Some human rights activists in the country, including feminist scholar Sylvia Tamale, support labia stretching.

== Zambia ==
According to a report in the Global Press Journal, labia stretching is common in Zambia, but such a social taboo that it is rarely discussed. It is defended by traditional marriage counsellors and challenged by feminist activists.

Wala Nalungwe, a feminist and activist, says that powerful, cultural figures – such as marriage counselors and family matriarchs – unfairly pressure young women to stretch their labia. ... even older women do not understand why they pull their labia, she says. They manufacture false reasons to support the practice, scaring girls into pulling. ... The practice of labia stretching denies women and girls autonomy over their bodies and sexuality, she says. ... "It is unfair that girls and young women are taught to pull their labia minora for the sexual gratification of their male partners, not for their own sexual fulfillment."

== South Pacific ==
Labia modification is documented as having existed in cultures outside Africa, particularly in the South Pacific. Robert Carl Suggs wrote about it in 1966 regarding the culture of the Marquesas Islands.

== Links to other practices ==
Scholars link labial elongation with genital tattooing. Elsdon Best wrote about the Māori (published in 1924, but apparently referring to a historical custom he had not witnessed himself): "Women were occasionally tattooed on the private parts, and this was a custom among Fijian women. It was alluded to as a tara whakairo." Belgian missionary Gustaaf Hulstaert wrote about genital tattooing in 1938 in Le mariage des Nkundó, about the Mongo people of the Congo: "Both women and men wear tattoos, but it is more common among women. For women, it is considered more sexual and often located near the sex organs."

Quoted on the overview of the Mongo people by the Database for Indigenous Cultural Evolution at the University of Missouri. Bronisław Malinowski wrote about the Trobriand Islands in The Sexual Life of Savages in North-Western Melanesia:

The body, as distinguished from the face, is very seldom painted, and no tattoo markings are ever visible. I am told that girls at the time of their first menstruation are tattooed round the vagina. This tattooing is called ki'uki'u, and is done, according to my informants, for aesthetic purposes.

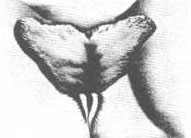
Closeup of enlarged labia, spread

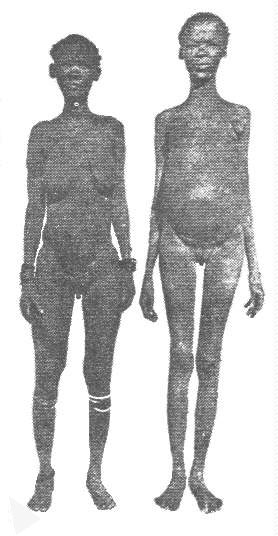
Khoikhoi women with enlarged labia

== See also ==
- Clitoral enlargement methods
- Labia piercing
- Labia pride
- Sarah Baartman
- Steatopygia
- Stretching (body piercing)
- Vagina and vulva in art
