= Femalia =

1993 book

- Editor: Joani Blank
- Illustrator: Photographs by Tee Corinne, Michael Perry, Jill Posener, and Michael A. Rosen
- Language: English
- Publisher: Down There Press, Last Gasp
- Publication date: 1993
- Publication place: United States of America
- ISBN: 0-940208-15-6 (first edition)
- OCLC: 770822165

Femalia is a book of 32 full-color photographs of human vulvas, edited by Joani Blank and first published by Down There Press in 1993. A reprint edition was published by Last Gasp in 2011. The photographs were taken by Tee Corinne, Michael Perry, Jill Posener, and Michael A. Rosen. The photographs are presented without commentary, except for Blank's brief introduction to the volume as a whole. Blank wanted to present accurate images of the subject, in contrast to pornographic or medical ones.

== History ==
The word used as the book's title, femalia, was taken from the novel Vox by Nicholson Baker. The photographs by Corinne and Perry had been taken years before the book's original publication in 1993; those by Posener and Rosen were taken specifically for inclusion in the first edition of Femalia.

Femalia grew out of Blank's long-term work as a feminist sex educator. She felt that medical and pornographic images of the female genitals were inadequate to her purposes. In her introduction to the first edition, Blank lamented the absence of readily available photographic representations of the vulva other than heavily edited images in male-oriented pornography, and the resulting feeling on the part of a majority of women that "in one way or another, their genitals are not quite 'normal'".

== Feminist response ==
Feminist authors have sharply contrasted the portrayals of vulvas in Femalia with those in typical male-oriented pornography and in biomedical sources. Femalia's portrayals are characterized as accurate, honest, open, and truthful, as exhibiting "stark reality"; as promoting a positive view of the vulva; as emphasizing the diversity of the vulva in different women, as well as the diversity of opinions and perspectives about the vulva on the part of both men and women; and as emphasizing female autonomy. By contrast, portrayals of the vulva in pornography and in biomedical science are characterized as stylized and uniform, excluding women whose genitalia do not match their models. Pornographic portrayals are further characterized as commodified, and medical portrayals as sterile. Feminist sex educators have advocated perusal of the images in Femalia as an exercise to help women to regard their genitals in a more positive light.

== Civil liberties ==
Librarian Sanford Berman has cited Femalia as an example to illustrate his thesis that libraries engage in inappropriate self-censorship, often motivated by concerns about controversial sexual content, in deciding which books to stock. Berman comments, "A detailed, artistic picture of a seashell adorns the cover. Were the contents strictly shell photos, the book might make it into at least some libraries. Shells, yes. Vulvas, no."

== Science and medicine ==
=== Research on depiction and perception of female genitals ===
In a study of systematic differences in the depiction of female genitals in online pornography, anatomy textbooks, and feminist publications, Femalia was used as one of three sources of sample depictions in the feminist publications category. This study found a statistically significant difference between online pornography and feminist publications in depicted protuberance of the labia minora, with greater mean protuberance shown in the feminist publications. It also found greater variation in measured genital proportions shown in the feminist publications than in sources in the other two categories.

Femalia was used as one of two sources of sample depictions of female genitals (the other was Penthouse) in a psychological study of the relationship between women's aesthetic perceptions of female genitals and their attitudes toward gynecological examinations. More specifically, the examinations in question were Pap smears, and the relevant attitudes were anxiety, embarrassment, and likelihood of making or keeping an appointment for a Pap smear.

=== Educational role in clinical practice ===
The Royal Australian College of General Practitioners (RACGP) has published a guideline document, authored by Magdalena Simonis under authority of the RACGP, intended to inform healthcare professionals about female genital cosmetic surgery (FGCS), such as labiaplasty, and to advise them about management of patient requests for FGCS. In this document, Simonis identifies lack of appreciation of female genital diversity, not only on the part of the public but also on the part of healthcare professionals, as a contributing factor to the demand for FGCS. She advocates the use of Femalia as a tool for patient education about genital diversity, in part because it depicts female genitals without digital enhancement. Simonis has further referenced this educational use of Femalia in slide and poster presentations intended to promote better management of the demand for FGCS on the part of healthcare professionals.

Medical anthropologist Eric Plemons has stated that:

The feminist commitment to ostensibly unmediated representation of 'natural' female genitals is one whose value has also been recognized by medical experts; Femalia has had an unanticipated life in clinical literature.

Plemons documents the use of Femalia as a resource to demonstrate the existence of female genital diversity, and to educate both clinicians and patients as to the range of normal vulval appearance. He attributes its widespread use by healthcare professionals to their belief that "it is one of very few photographic collections of 'normal' vulvas that exists".

=== Transgender genital cosmesis ===
Femalia has been used as a way of assessing preferences for perineal and genital cosmetic appearance, to improve cosmesis in trans women undergoing genital gender-affirming surgery. Beginning in the year 2000, surgeon Neal Wilson began showing photographs from Femalia to his prospective patients and asking them to indicate which vulvas they found most aesthetically pleasing, as well as which ones they would choose for themselves. Wilson attempted to approximate through surgery the appearance of the photographs from Femalia selected by his prospective patients, even though he held that they set "impossible standards" because of the limitations of early 21st-century surgical technique. Wilson has republished, in an online journal article, the three photographs most often selected by his patients. He has also provided summary statistics concerning his patients' choices of vulval photographs from Femalia, as well as a short narrative summary of the specific anatomical features that he believed to be characteristic of the most popular photographs.

== See also ==
- 101 Vagina
- Labia pride
- Sex-positive feminism
- Vagina and vulva in art
