= 101 Vagina =

2013 coffee table book by Philip Werner

- Author: Philip Werner
- Language: English
- Subject: Female body image/sexuality
- Genre: Photography
- Published: 2013
- Publication place: Australia
- Pages: 216
- ISBN: 9780987409003

101 Vagina is a black-and-white coffee table photo-book by Philip Werner, with a foreword by Toni Childs. It was self-published in March 2013 in Melbourne, Australia. The book contains 101 close-up nude photos shot in a non-provocative way, along with an accompanying story or message written by each woman about her vagina.

The book's photos and stories were exhibited five times in Australia in 2013, with a US and Canadian tour in 2014 taking place in six locations.

== Publication ==
101 Vagina was funded by crowdsourcing and took some two years to create. Werner was initially inspired by The Vagina Monologues and subjects were found via social media after Werner publicised his objective to create a book that had both an educational and celebratory goal. The models, ranging in age from 18 to 65, remain anonymous. Singer-songwriter Toni Childs, who wrote the foreword, made contact with Werner after he initiated a peace march in honour of murdered Australian Broadcasting Corporation employee Jill Meagher in his Brunswick, Victoria, neighbourhood.

Speaking to The Sydney Morning Herald about the book, Werner commented that: "I hope it finds its way to a few young women and girls...So they see that [these pictures are] normal rather than pictures in magazines." Stories accompanying the photos discuss various themes, including ageing, pregnancy, Brazilian waxing, first sexual encounter and poor body image.

== Reception ==
On publication, 101 Vagina received broad media coverage, including write-ups in The Age, The Sydney Morning Herald and La Presse in Montreal. It was also discussed on ABC Radio National and 2SER.

=== Exhibitions ===
101 Vagina was presented as an exhibition on several occasions in Australia in 2013. This included being part of The Sydney Fringe and Melbourne Fringe Festival. In 2014, it was officially launched in the US and Canada with a series of exhibitions. The tour included Los Angeles and Laguna Beach.

==== Controversy and censorship ====
In Sydney, the exhibition was visited by police responding to a complaint that the images were visible from the street. Images were required to be censored as part of a group exhibition at The Sydney Fringe.

== See also ==
- Vagina and vulva in art
- Jamie McCartney
- Femalia
