= Clitoral enlargement methods =

Forms of body modification

Clitoral enlargement methods are forms of body modification that have the potential to increase the size of the clitoris and enhance sexual pleasure. Clitoral enlargement can be accomplished through a variety of means, each potentially having certain side effects and risks.

The congenital or acquired medical condition known as clitoromegaly or macroclitoris contrasts intentional enlargement of the clitoris, though any abnormal enlargement of the clitoris is sometimes referred to as clitoromegaly.

== Purpose ==
There are multiple reasons someone might want to enlarge their clitoris. For some, it is a personal aesthetic choice. People who think that the size of their clitoris prevents adequate stimulation from sexual acts that can directly stimulate the clitoris, such as the coital alignment technique, may choose to enlarge the clitoris in the prospect that it will be easier to stimulate. For others, clitoral enlargement can be considered a form of gender-affirming care.

In recent years, publications including Cosmopolitan and the sexual health website Giddy have reported on the growing popularity of intentionally enlarging the clitoris through the use of testosterone or dihydrotestosterone (DHT). Reported motivations include aesthetic preferences and the desire to increase sexual sensitivity or facilitate orgasms. Medical professionals interviewed in these publications have expressed concerns about the unsupervised use of androgens, warning of potential adverse effects, including acne, increased body hair, voice deepening and hormonal disturbances.

== Methods ==
Methods of clitoris enlargement include:

Permanently enlarged clitoris after androgen-use (DHT)

Permanent enlargement

- Use of androgens such as testosterone or anabolic steroids. Administration routes can be transdermal (such as creams, gels or patches), oral, subcutaneous injections or implants. In transgender men and nonbinary people this is referred to as masculinizing hormone therapy. The effects of hormonal treatment vary individually, primarily depending on genetical factors. Low dosage topical application may be sufficient for those looking only to have a larger clitoris and avoid other unwanted virilizing effects.
- Plastic surgery (Clitoroplasty).
- Autologous fat transplantation.
- Injection of dermal fillers such as hyaluronic acid.

Temporary enlargement

- Use of a clitoral pump, similar to a penis pump, prior to or during masturbation or other sexual activity.
- Inflation using saline injections.

== See also ==
- Elongated labia
- Labia stretching
- Penis enlargement
- Gender-affirming surgery (female-to-male) often uses clitoral tissue to construct a new penis
