= Vagina and vulva in art =

Visual art representing female genitalia

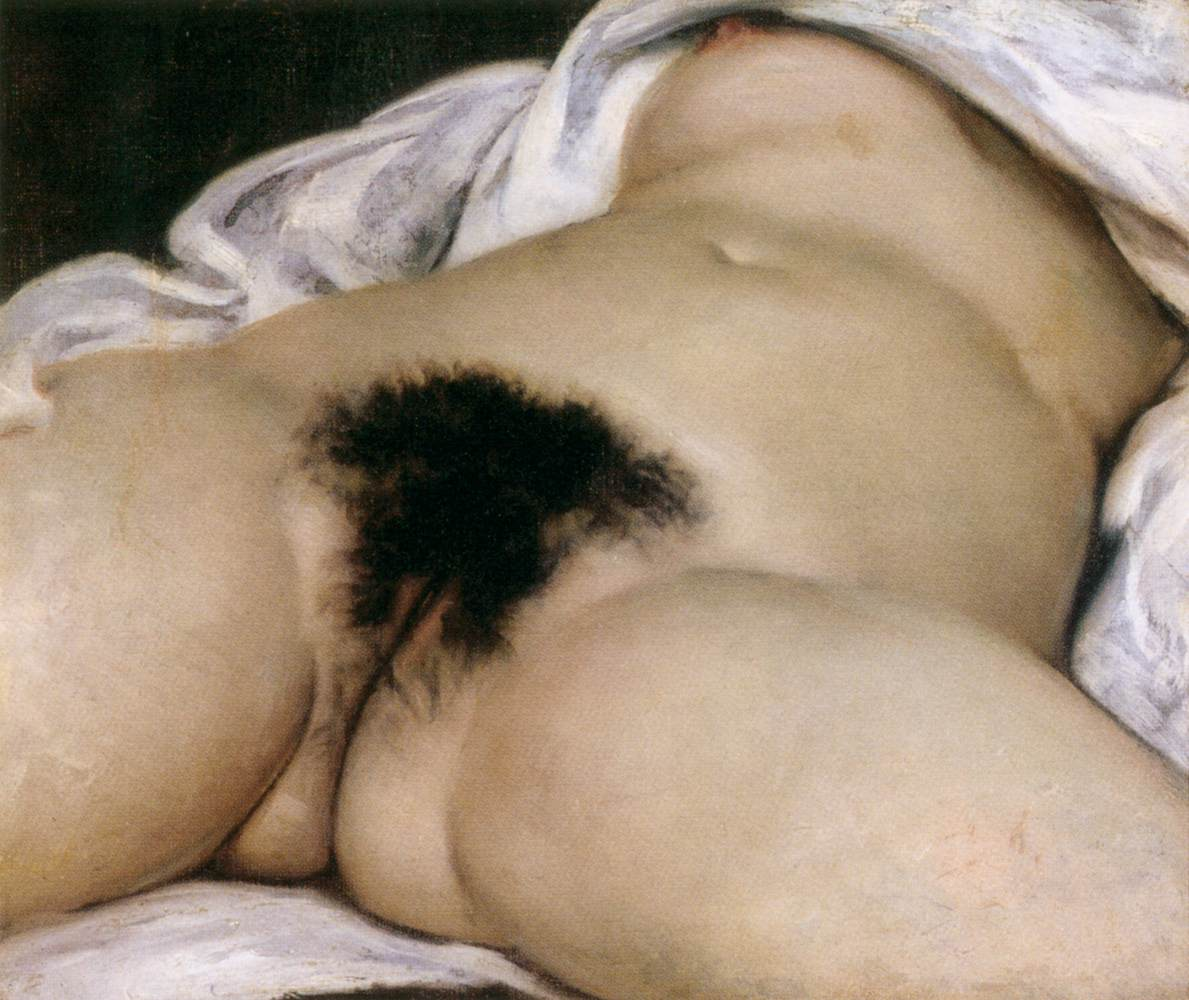
Gustave Courbet's 1866 painting "The Origin of the World"

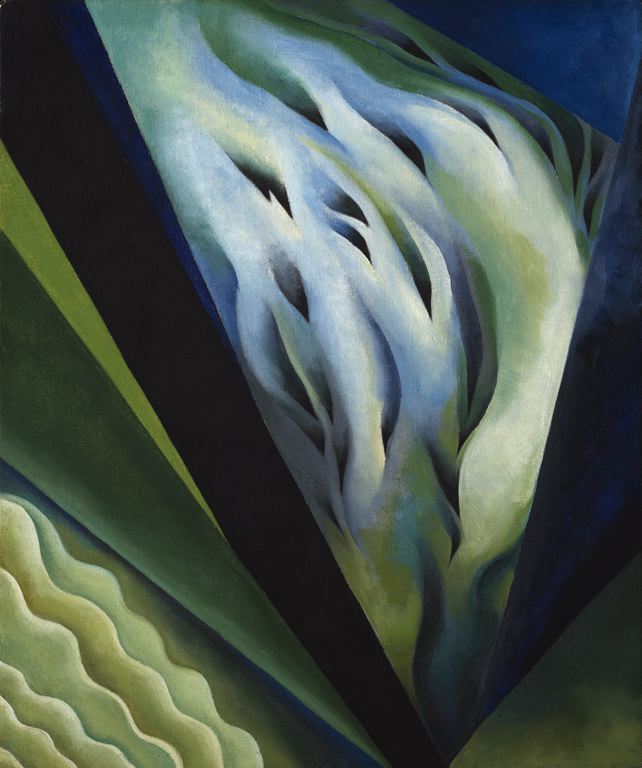
While Georgia O'Keeffe's paintings have been interpreted by some modern feminist artists as stylized depictions of the vulva, O'Keeffe herself consistently denied these Freudian interpretations of her paintings (pictured is "Blue and Green Music", 1921).

The vagina and vulva have been depicted from prehistory onwards. Visual art forms representing the female genitals encompass two-dimensional (e.g. paintings) and three-dimensional (e.g. statuettes). As long ago as 35,000 years ago, people sculpted Venus figurines that exaggerated the abdomen, hips, breasts, thighs, or vulva.

In 1866, Gustave Courbet painted a picture of a nude woman with her legs apart, entitled "The Origin of the World". When this was posted on Facebook 150 years later, it created a censorship controversy. Contemporary artists can still face backlash for depicting the female genitals; Megumi Igarashi was arrested for distributing a 3D digital file of her vulva. Works created since the advent of second-wave feminism circa 1965 range from large walk-through installations (Niki de Saint Phalle and Jean Tinguely) to small hand-held textile art pieces. Sometimes these are explicitly works of feminist art: Judy Chicago created The Dinner Party to celebrate 39 women of history and myth, many of whom had fallen into obscurity. Other artists deny that their works reference the female genitalia, although critics view them as such; the flower paintings of Georgia O'Keeffe are a case in point.

In 2021, medical professionals have found that knowledge of female reproductive organs remains poor, among both men and women; some modern works such as Femalia, 101 Vagina and the Great Wall of Vagina seek to combat this ignorance by providing accessible depictions of the normal diversity of a range of vulvas.

Other forms of creative expression beyond visual art have brought the discussion of female sexuality into the mainstream. Playwright Eve Ensler wrote The Vagina Monologues, a popular stage work about many aspects of women's sexuality.

== Cultural aspects ==
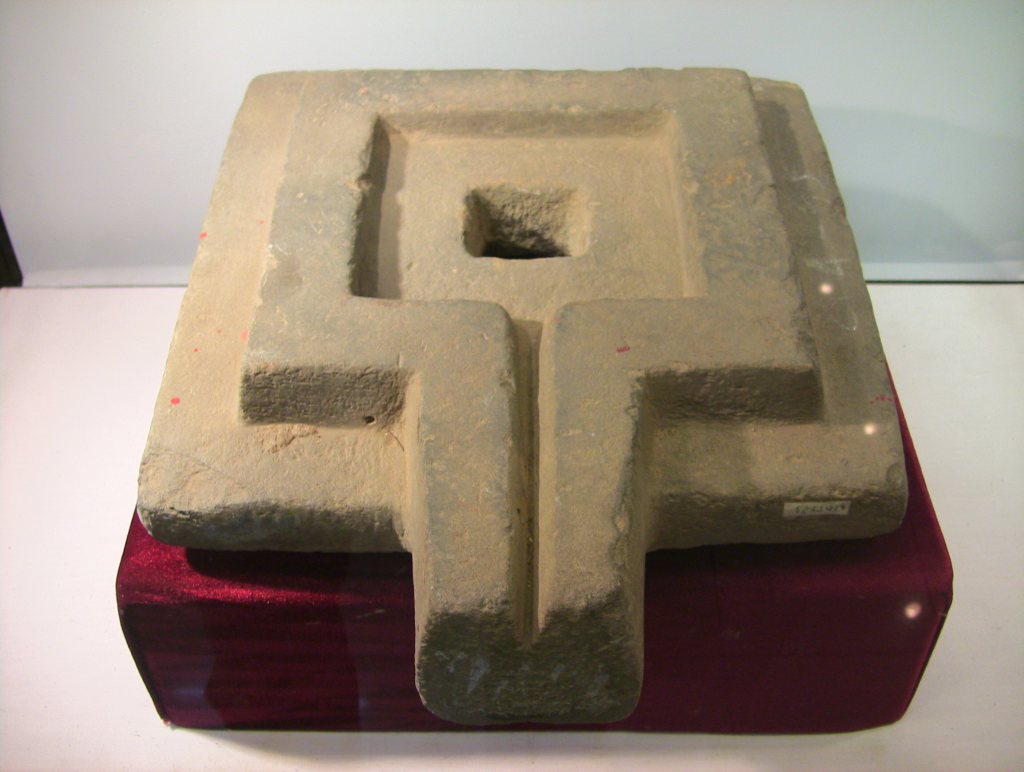
The vagina represents a powerful symbol as the yoni in Hindu thought. Pictured is a stone yoni found in Cát Tiên sanctuary, Lam Dong, Vietnam.

Various perceptions of the vagina have existed throughout history, including the belief that it is the center of sexual desire, a metaphor for life via birth, inferior to the penis, visually unappealing, inherently unpleasant to smell, or otherwise vulgar.

Hinduism has created the symbol of the yoni, and this may indicate the value that Hindu society has given female sexuality and the vagina's ability to birth life.

There have long been folklore traditions, such as the vagina loquens ("talking vagina") and the vagina dentata ("toothed vagina").

The vagina has been known by many names, including the ancient word (since considered a vulgarism) "cunt", euphemisms ("lady garden"), slang ("pussy"), and derogatory epithets. Some cultures view the vulva as something shameful that should be hidden. For example, the term pudendum, the Latin term used in medical English for the external genitalia, literally means "shameful thing".

== History ==
=== Prehistory ===
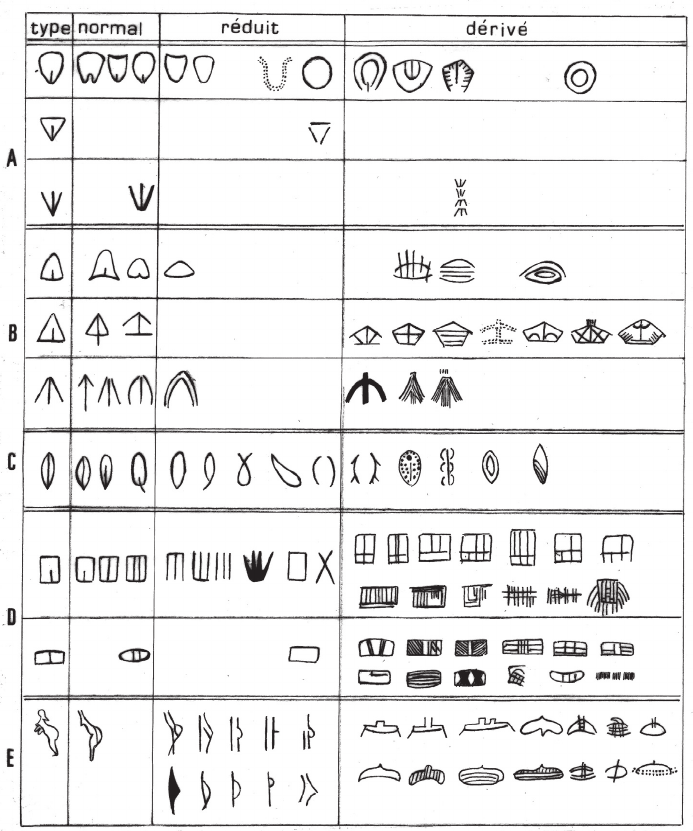

The Venus of Hohle Fels sculpture, which is at least 35,000 years old, is the oldest example of a vulva in art.

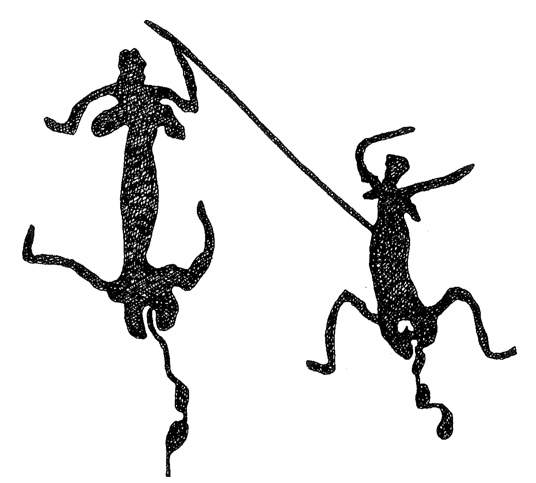
Two women dancing and menstruating, with the outline of their genitals clearly visible. Rock art by Indigenous Australians from the Upper Yule River, Pilbara, Western Australia.

Two-dimensional and three-dimensional representations of the vulva, i.e. paintings and figurines, exist from tens of millennia ago. They are some of the earliest works of prehistoric art.

The cave of Chufín located in the town of Riclones in Cantabria (Spain) has prehistoric rock art which may be a depiction of the vulva. The cave was occupied at different periods, the oldest being around 20,000 years ago. Aside from schematic engravings and paintings of animals, there are also many symbols, such as those known as "sticks". There is also a large number of drawings using points (puntillaje), including one which has been interpreted as a representation of a vulva.

A Venus figurine is an Upper Paleolithic statuette portraying a woman. Most have been unearthed in Europe, but others have been found as far away as Siberia, extending their distribution across much of Eurasia. Most of them date from the Gravettian period (28,000–22,000 years ago), but examples exist as early as the Venus of Hohle Fels, which dates back at least 35,000 years to the Aurignacian, and as late as the Venus of Monruz, from about 11,000 years ago in the Magdalenian.

These figurines were carved from soft stone (such as steatite, calcite or limestone), bone or ivory, or formed of clay and fired. The latter are among the oldest ceramics known. In total, over a hundred such figurines are known; virtually all of modest size, between 4 cm and 25 cm in height. Most of them have small heads, wide hips, and legs that taper to a point. Various figurines exaggerate the abdomen, hips, breasts, thighs, or vulva. In contrast, arms and feet are often absent, and the head is usually small and faceless.

=== Ancient times ===
The ancient Sumerians regarded the vulva as sacred and a vast number of Sumerian poems praising the vulva of the goddess Inanna have survived. In Sumerian religion, the goddess Nin-imma is the divine personification of female genitalia. Her name literally means "lady female genitals". She appears in one version of the myth of Enki and Ninsikila in which she is the daughter of Enki and Ninkurra. Enki rapes her and causes her to give birth to Uttu, the goddess of weaving and vegetation. Vaginal fluid is always described in Sumerian texts as tasting "sweet" and, in a Sumerian Bridal Hymn, a young maiden rejoices that her vulva has grown hair. Clay models of vulvae were discovered in the temple of Inanna at Ashur; these models likely served as some form of amulets, possibly to protect against impotency.

=== 11th and 12th century ===
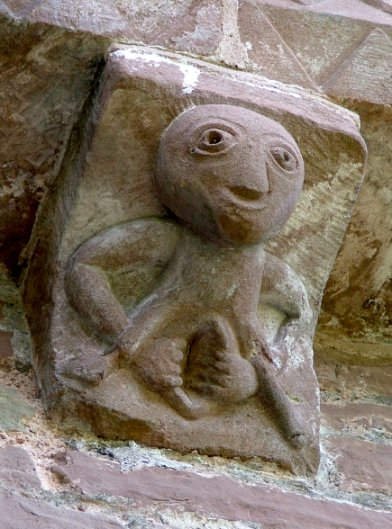
A 12th century sheela na gig on the church at Kilpeck, Herefordshire, England

Sheela na gigs are 11th and 12th-century figurative carvings of naked women displaying an exaggerated vulva. They are architectural grotesques found on churches, castles, and other buildings, particularly in Ireland and Great Britain, sometimes together with male figures. One of the best examples may be found in the Round Tower at Rattoo, in County Kerry, Ireland. There is a replica of the round tower sheela na gig in the county museum in Tralee town. Another well-known example may be seen at Kilpeck in Herefordshire, England.

Such carvings are said to ward off death and evil. Other grotesques, such as gargoyles and hunky punks, were frequently part of church decorations all over Europe. It is commonly said that their purpose was to keep evil spirits away through the use of apotropaic magic. They often are positioned over doors or windows, presumably to protect these openings.

Weir and Jerman argue that their location on churches and the grotesque features of the figures, by medieval standards, suggests that they represented female lust as hideous and sinfully corrupting. Another theory, espoused by Joanne McMahon and Jack Roberts, is that the carvings are remnants of a pre-Christian fertility or mother goddess religion. A 2016 book by Starr Goode called the Sheela na gig: The Dark Goddess of Sacred Power, traces these images throughout history and contributes a discussion of the universality of "female sacred display" in it meanings and functions back to the origins of culture as seen in the Paleolithic cave art through the inclusion of the image in contemporary art, particularly feminist art.

=== Folklore traditions ===
The vagina loquens, or "talking vagina", is a significant tradition in literature and art, dating back to ancient folklore motifs. These tales usually involve vaginas talking due to the effect of magic or charms, and often admitting to their unchastity.

Another folk tale concerns the vagina dentata ("toothed vagina"). The implication of these tales is that sexual intercourse might result in injury, emasculation, or castration for the man involved. These stories were frequently told as cautionary tales warning of the dangers of unknown women and to discourage rape.

== Contemporary art ==
=== Second-wave feminism ===
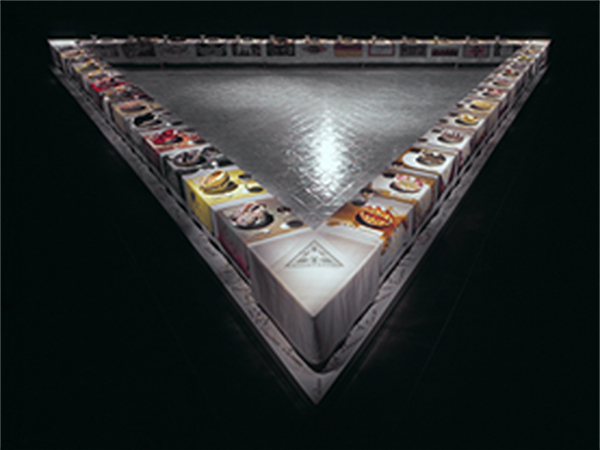
Judy Chicago's The Dinner Party

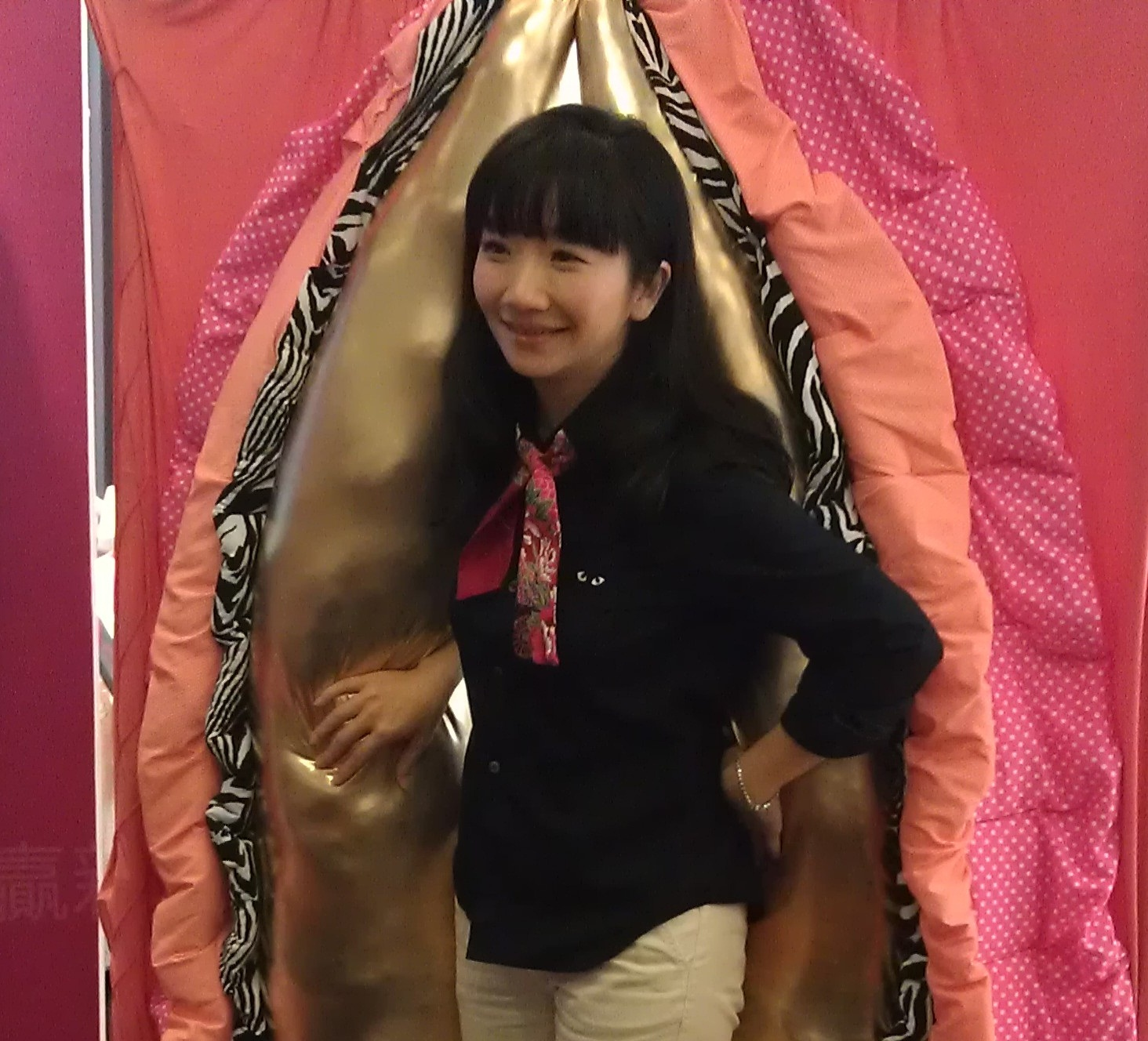
Matilda Tao with the set for a production of The Vagina Monologues

In 1966, the French artist Niki de Saint Phalle collaborated with Dadaist artist Jean Tinguely and Per Olof Ultvedt on a large sculpture installation entitled "Hon - en katedral" (also spelled "HON—en Katedrall"), which means "She - A Cathedral", for Moderna Museet, in Stockholm, Sweden. The outer form is a giant reclining sculpture of a woman with her legs spread. Museum patrons can go inside her body by entering a door-sized vaginal opening. Saint Phalle stated that the sculpture represented a fertility goddess who was able to receive visitors into her body and then "give birth" to them again. Inside her body is a screen showing Greta Garbo films, a goldfish pond and a soft drink vending machine. The piece elicited an immense public reaction in magazines and newspapers throughout the world.

In 1968, Monica Sjöö painted her most famous work, God Giving Birth, depicting a naked woman standing to deliver her baby, with its head protruding from her vulva. It is an expression of Sjöö's spiritual journey at that time and represents her perception of the Great Mother as the universal creator of cosmic life. The painting and its concept created much controversy and God Giving Birth was censored on several occasions; at a group show in London the painting led to Sjöö being reported to the police for blasphemy.

Dutch sculptor Ferdi Tajiri's 1968 "Wombtomb", now in the collection of the Rijksmuseum, is a cuddly, synthetic-fur-lined sarcophagus with a vulva-shaped opening on the lid. The artist originally used it for performances and "happenings" as well as display. Her work from this period also includes fabric sculptures of flowers with names such as "Vulva Pseudodomestica."

In 1975, American lesbian artist Tee Corinne published her Cunt Coloring Book which featured multiple line drawings of women's vaginas. She created the book to give sex education groups a useful tool for understanding vaginas. In 1981, after three printings she had to change the name to Labiaflowers, but this affected sales so she promptly changed it back to the original name.

From 1974 to 1979, Judy Chicago, a feminist artist, created the vulva-themed installation artwork "The Dinner Party". It consists of 39 elaborate place settings arranged along a triangular table for 39 mythical and historical famous women. Virginia Woolf, Susan B. Anthony, Eleanor of Aquitaine, and Theodora of Byzantium are among those honoured. Each plate, except the one corresponding to Sojourner Truth (a Black woman), depicts a brightly colored, elaborately styled butterfly-vulva form. After it was produced, despite resistance from the art world, it toured to 16 venues in six countries to a viewing audience of 15 million. Since 2007, it has been on permanent exhibition in the Elizabeth A. Sackler Center for Feminist Art at the Brooklyn Museum, New York. Chicago gave Georgia O'Keeffe a prominent place in The Dinner Party, because some modern feminists believe that O'Keeffe's detailed flower paintings such as Black Iris III (1926) evoke a veiled representation of female genitalia. O'Keeffe consistently denied the validity these Freudian interpretations of her art.

Femalia is a book of 32 full-color photographs of vulvas, edited by Joani Blank. It was first published by Down There Press in 1993 and republished by Last Gasp in 2011. The photographs, by several photographers, are presented without commentary, except for Blank's brief introduction to the volume as a whole. The author wanted to present accurate images of the subject, in contrast to pornographic or medical ones.

American Annie Sprinkle turned her genitals into performance art with her "Public Cervix Announcement", first unveiled in the early 1980s and then reprised for her 1990s touring show, "Post-Porn Modernist". In it, she lay back in a reclining chair on a low stage, inserted a speculum into her vagina, and invited members of the audience to look at her cervix. The phrase was taken up in 2018 by cancer charities in Britain and Australia asking women to take a Pap test (smear test) to rule out cervical cancer.

Modern artistic representation of the vagina coincides with 18th century anatomical dissection and identification of the genitalia (i.e., William Hunter). Contemporary art, from a feminist perspective, has revisited and deconstructed the androcentric view of woman genitalia and the stereotypical identification with female subjectivity (e.g., Ana Mendieta, Enrique Chagoya, Vik Muniz, Candice Lin).

The London performance art group the Neo Naturists had a song and an act called "Cunt Power", a name which potter Grayson Perry borrowed for one of his early works: "An unglazed piece of modest dimensions, made from terracotta like clay – labia carefully formed with once wet material, about its midriff".

The Vagina Monologues, a 1996 episodic play by Eve Ensler, has contributed to making female sexuality a topic of public discourse. It is made up of a varying number of monologues read by a number of women. Initially, Ensler performed every monologue herself, with subsequent performances featuring three actresses; latter versions feature a different actress for every role. Each of the monologues deals with an aspect of the feminine experience, touching on matters such as sexual activity, love, rape, menstruation, female genital mutilation, masturbation, birth, orgasm, the various common names for the vagina, or simply as a physical aspect of the body. A recurring theme throughout the pieces is the vagina as a tool of female empowerment, and the ultimate embodiment of individuality.

=== 2000s ===
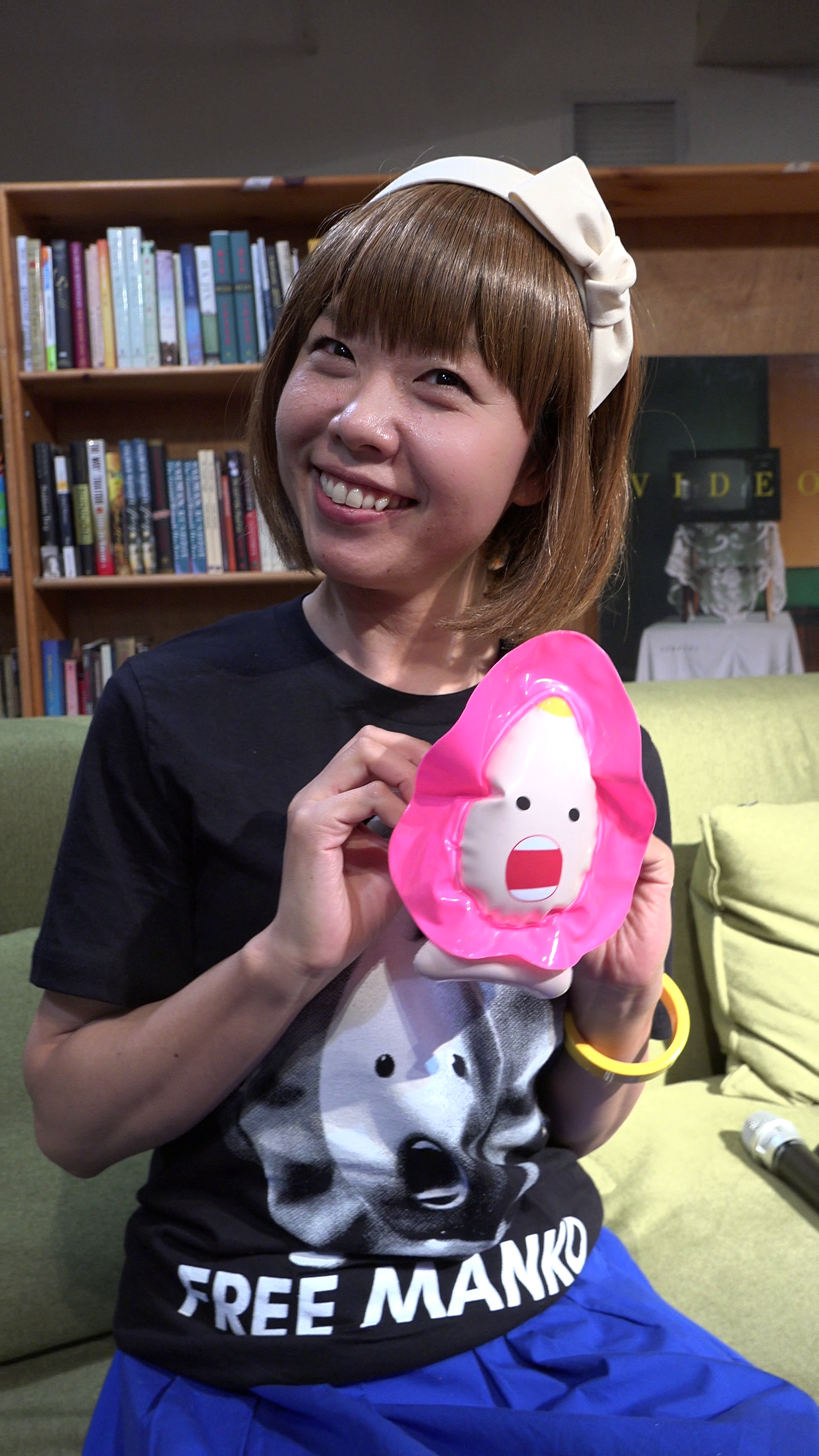
Megumi Igarashi and her pop-culture vulva character Manko-chan ("Miss Pussy")

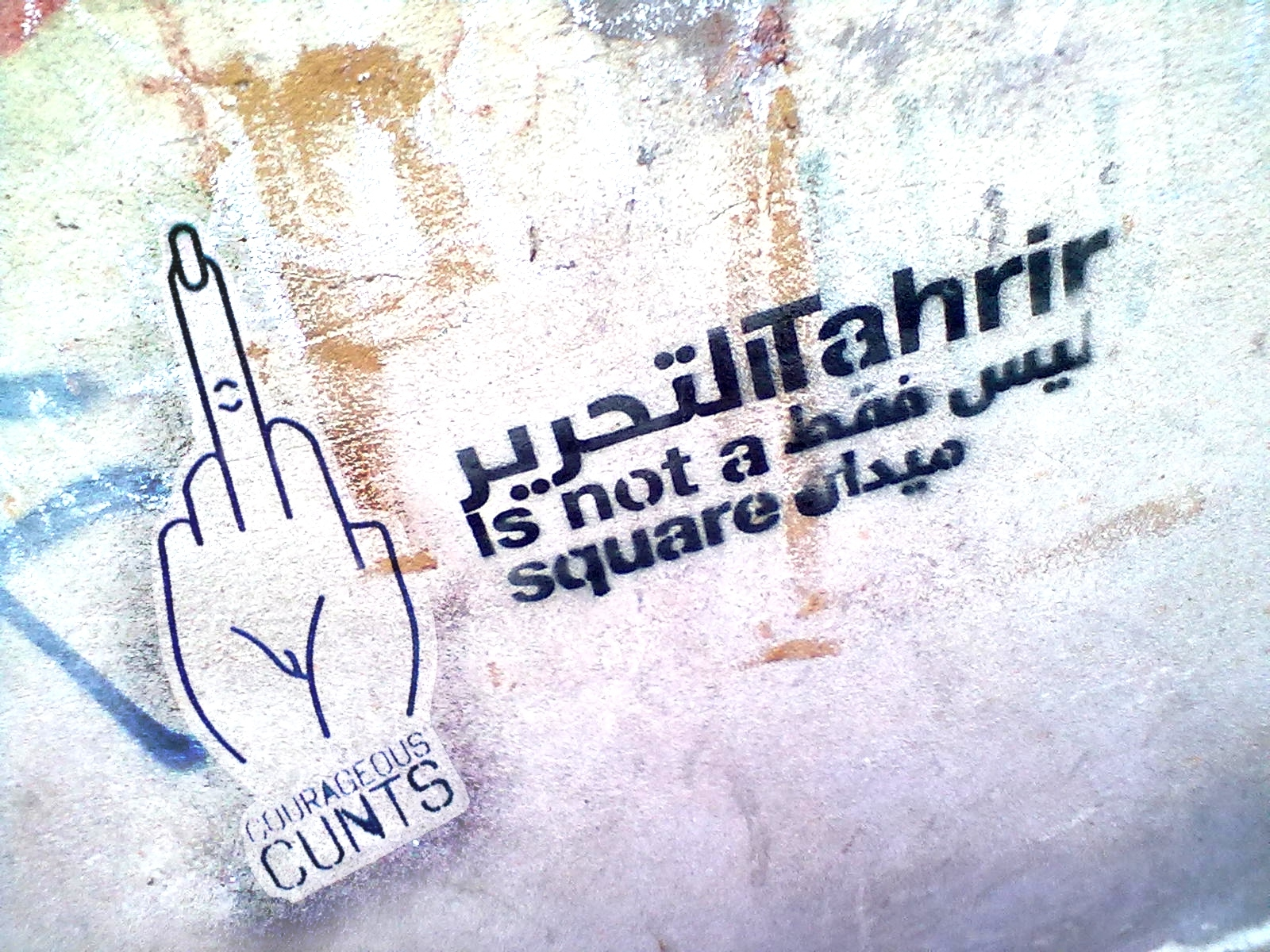
Street art stencil by the group Courageous Cunts, referencing the protests in Tahrir Square, Cairo

Starting in 2006, when "no one was talking about [vulvas and art]", Jamie McCartney spent five years creating the work for which he is best known, the Great Wall of Vagina, featuring casts of the vulvas of hundreds of women. The Brighton-based artist began the project in response to the rise in labiaplasty, wanting to provide realistic, non-pornographic portrayals of the widespread variation of anatomy. "Don't change your parts, change your partner," became one of his slogans, along with the overarching message "You're normal. Whatever you've got down there, leave it alone.". By 2015, he said the cultural climate had shifted. "A lot of vagina and vulva artworks are going on. It's almost like a movement." His own project continued to evolve, displaying the Wall at Triennale di Milano museum, and casting more women at the Red Tent Revival festival in the United States.

On the other side of the world, another male artist conceived of a similar project at about the same time. Once he had the idea, Greg Taylor tried to persuade female artists to take it on, but they declined, so he pressed ahead, creating scores of white porcelain vulvas, "each individual portraits of different women, each as gripping as a face". "CUNTS and other conversations" (2009) was deemed controversial for both its title and content, with Australia Post warning the artist that the publicity postcards were illegal. The work was purchased by the Museum of Old and New Art in Tasmania, after Taylor did one final cast, of the vulva of Kirsha Kaechele.

Aidan Salahova, an Azeri and Russian artist and gallerist, was invited to submit pieces for the Azerbaijan Pavilion at the 54th Venice Biennale (held in 2011). One of her artworks was entitled "Black Stone", a reference to the object at the centre of Mecca, venerated by Muslims worldwide. The real Black Stone is surrounded by a silver frame; Salahova's sculpture had "a vagina-like marble frame", according to an article in ArtInfo. Two of her artworks previously approved by the ministry of culture were ordered to be covered and eventually removed from the exhibition a day before the opening, "because of government sensitives towards the nation's status as a secular Muslim country". Officials claimed that the works had been damaged during transportation. Commenting on the conflict, the pavilion curator Beral Madra stated that the concept of the removed sculptures had been misinterpreted by the government, and added that in over 25 years of curating she had not "ever experienced this kind of conflict".

In 2012, an image of an 1866 Gustave Courbet painting of the female genitals, entitled "The Origin of the World", being posted on Facebook led to a legal dispute. After a French teacher posted an image of the painting, Facebook considered the image to be pornographic and suspended his account for violating its terms of use. The Huffington Post called the painting "a frank image of a vagina." Mark Stern of Slate, who called the painting a stunning, brilliant "cornerstone of the French Realistic movement", states that the teacher then sued the website for allegedly violating his freedom of speech.

In 2012, New York artist Sophia Wallace started to work on the multimedia project Cliteracy to challenge misconceptions about the clitoris.

In October 2013, artist Peter Reynosa painted the pop singer Madonna "in the shape of a defiant yonic symbol", titling the red and white acrylic work "I Am the Cunt of Western Civilization", a 1990 quote from the singer.

A site-specific walk-through vagina was installed at Constitution Hill, Johannesburg in 2013, in the decommissioned women's prison that had held anti-apartheid activists such as Winnie Mandela. The artist, Reshma Chhiba, observed that "Not many people - men or women - are unfazed about walking through this vaginal canal." The soundtrack of laughter and screaming acted as "a battle cry which revolts against the prison". According to TimesLIVE, it was part of a larger multisite project entitled "The Two Talking Yonis" (yoni being the Sanskrit word for vulva) The artist contextualized her work within the epidemic of sexual violence in South Africa, calling for respect for the female body.

101 Vagina is a 2013 black-and-white photo-book by Philip Werner, with a foreword by Toni Childs. The book contains 101 close-up nude photos shot in a non-provocative way, along with an accompanying story or message written by each woman about her vagina. The book's photos and stories were exhibited five times in Australia in 2013, with a US and Canadian tour in 2014 taking in six locations. Werner was initially inspired by The Vagina Monologues and subjects were found via social media after Werner publicised his objective to create a book that had both an educational and celebratory goal. Stories accompanying the photos discuss various themes, including ageing, pregnancy, Brazilian waxing, first sexual encounter and poor body image. In Sydney, the exhibition was visited by police responding to a complaint that the images were visible from the street. Images were required to be censored as part of a group exhibition at The Sydney Fringe.

Lena Marquise is a Russian-born, American visual and performance artist. Her work often covers the subjects of sex work and censorship, eliciting critical response for its controversial eroticism. In 2014, at Art Basel Miami, Marquise performed in an installation artwork, "Body As Commodity", in which she charged cellphones with her vagina. Musical artist Usher visited JJ Brine's VECTOR Gallery, and stories on whether he did or did not charge his phone ensured widespread media coverage of Marquise's work.

In Japan, artist Megumi Igarashi has drawn attention for her work featuring vaginas and vulvas, which she considers "overly hidden" in Japanese culture compared to male genitalia. In July 2014, Igarashi was arrested for distributing 3D data of her vulva to contributors to her crowdsource campaign. She has also made vagina-themed sculptures. While police charged Igarashi for her vulva- and vagina-themed artworks, there are several phallus festivals in Japan in which participants parade with massive penis sculptures, a practice which is deemed acceptable by authorities.

=== 2015 onwards ===
In 2015, Anish Kapoor, a Turner Prize-winning artist, created controversy with his sculpture entitled "Dirty Corner", a "massive steel funnel set in broken stone, placed in the garden of the...Palace of Versailles", which he claims is a depiction of the vagina of the former Queen of France.

The streetart project Clitorosity, started by Laura Kingsley with her chalk drawings of the clitoris in public places, is a "community-driven effort to celebrate the full structure of the clitoris", that has since spread to almost 100 cities.

In 2018, British artist Laura Dodsworth created a book and corresponding documentary which featured 100 photographs of vulvas. The book, named 'Womanhood' showed each woman's vulva alongside her personal story. It featured the stories of trans women, women who had suffered female genital mutilation, women who had given birth and women who had been sexually assaulted. She decided to do the project after her success with men in 'Manhood' and wanted to give the same voice the men had but for women.

"Pynk", a 2018 song by Janelle Monáe, featured a music video in which the dancers wore distinctive pink vulva trousers.

In 2018, artist Kate Frazer Rego exhibited "Labia Series: A Fresh Look at the Feminine", a collection of wall-mounted vulvic sculptures made from fabric and found objects, in New Bedford, Massachusetts.

Diva, a huge piece of installation art, was unveiled in 2020 at a rural art park in Brazil. Its creator, Juliana Notari, described how 20 men laboured to dig the vulva, 33m long, 16m wide, and 6m deep into the hillside. It provoked a culture war-type split between those who supported the work and the supporters of right-wing president Bolsonaro

For the 2021 redesign of her Los Angeles house, model and actress Cara Delevingne commissioned "a 'pussy palace', a tactile pink suedette-lined secret room" and a "vagina tunnel" . According to Architectural Digest, the latter, created by Stephen Reynolds, is "a secret passageway concealed behind a low, painted panel, which leads from the living room to an adjacent bunk room. One enters the so-called rebirth canal through a vulval soft sculpture (think Judy Chicago on acid) and then proceeds to crawl out of a round washing-machine door suggestive of a rectum."

Following advances in understanding the anatomy of the clitoris, 21st century artists and activists have taken on the task of representing the clitoris in contemporary art. Unlike the rest of the vulva, its clitoris is mostly internal and therefore harder to study. In 2016, Lori-Malépart Traversy made an animated documentary about the unrecognized anatomy of the clitoris. In 2017, Alli Sebastian Wolf created a golden 100:1 scale model anatomical of a clitoris, called the Glitoris and said, she hopes knowledge of the clitoris will soon become so uncontroversial that making art about them would be as irrelevant as making art about penises.

Also internal and invisible are the ovaries, which became a motif for former East Berliner Jess de Wahls, "enfant terrible of British textile arts". The Crafts Council credits her with coining the term "retex sculpture" (upcycling textiles), and her self-taught art follows in the feminist tradition of working with fibre. Her 2014 solo exhibition "Big Swinging Ovaries" included hand-stitched portraits of women such as Sue Black, Baroness Black of Strome, as well as many representations of the eponymous organs: "her trademark symbol, ovaries, which take on various incarnations depending on how the mood takes her -- transformed as a cactus, as a rainbow in the sky, or a defiantly raised middle finger." Prior to her 2018 Australian exhibition, Frankie magazine pointed out that most people—even women—probably don't know what ovaries look like Wahls said, "the Big Swinging Ovaries name and design has very much become a brand and a visual tool for expressing many of my creative, political and social thoughts as a woman, a feminist and a textile artist."

Other artists using these to make a point include the Ovaries Project, "painting abstract ovaries that resembled watercolor flowers" onto Tshirts featured in Vogue and selling them to benefit women's health initiatives. The Tate holds a work by Luciano Fabro entitled "Ovaries" (1988), depicting carved marble eggs held in a pair of steel cables.

Likewise, the uterus holds its place in art. Wangechi Mutu uses Victorian medical images as a base on which to layer meanings. Mutu's 12-panel series Histology of the Different Classes of Uterine Tumors (2004) is made up of collaged digital prints. The series is held by the Saatchi Gallery.

Zoë Buckman, "known for her multidisciplinary explorations of feminism and mortality", created "Champ" in response to the MeToo movement. It was displayed first at the 2016 Democratic National Convention. Its 2018 re-creation as a "rotating 43-foot-high neon outline of a uterus with fiberglass boxing gloves in place of ovaries" and installed on Sunset Boulevard in the heart of Hollywood.

In 2021, Priya Khanchandani, a curator at London's Design Museum, imagined the plethora of vulva art projects as a "re-balancing" with the past century of phallic symbolism in architecture. She sees a "resurgence of interest" in female designers, artists and architects, and "the idea of the vagina as a design trope is symbolic of that".

In 2021, the Italian artist Gioia Raparelli, during the exhibition Festival Della Vagina Felice, "proposed her artistic project The Sacred Vulva to remind all women of their strength, which lies in a conscious matriarchy that has its origins since the beginning of humanity”. During the weekend against gender violence held in the Metropolitan City of Rome in 2025, the purpose of the performance "Sacred Vulva" was to help the audience understand those who commit violence, and the indelible signs left on those who experience it.

In March 2026, on the occasion of International Women's Day, the exhibition "Sacred Vulva Everywhere Everytime" by Italian artist Gioia Raparelli was held in Grottaferrata near Rome, Italy. The artist asks the question: "What would modern society have been like if the cult of the Great Mother had persisted to this day?".

== See also ==
- Culture and menstruation
- Erotic art
- Pregnancy in art
- Vaginamuseum – an internet project based in Austria
- Vagina Museum – a museum in London, England
