= Megumi Igarashi =

Japanese sculptor and manga artist

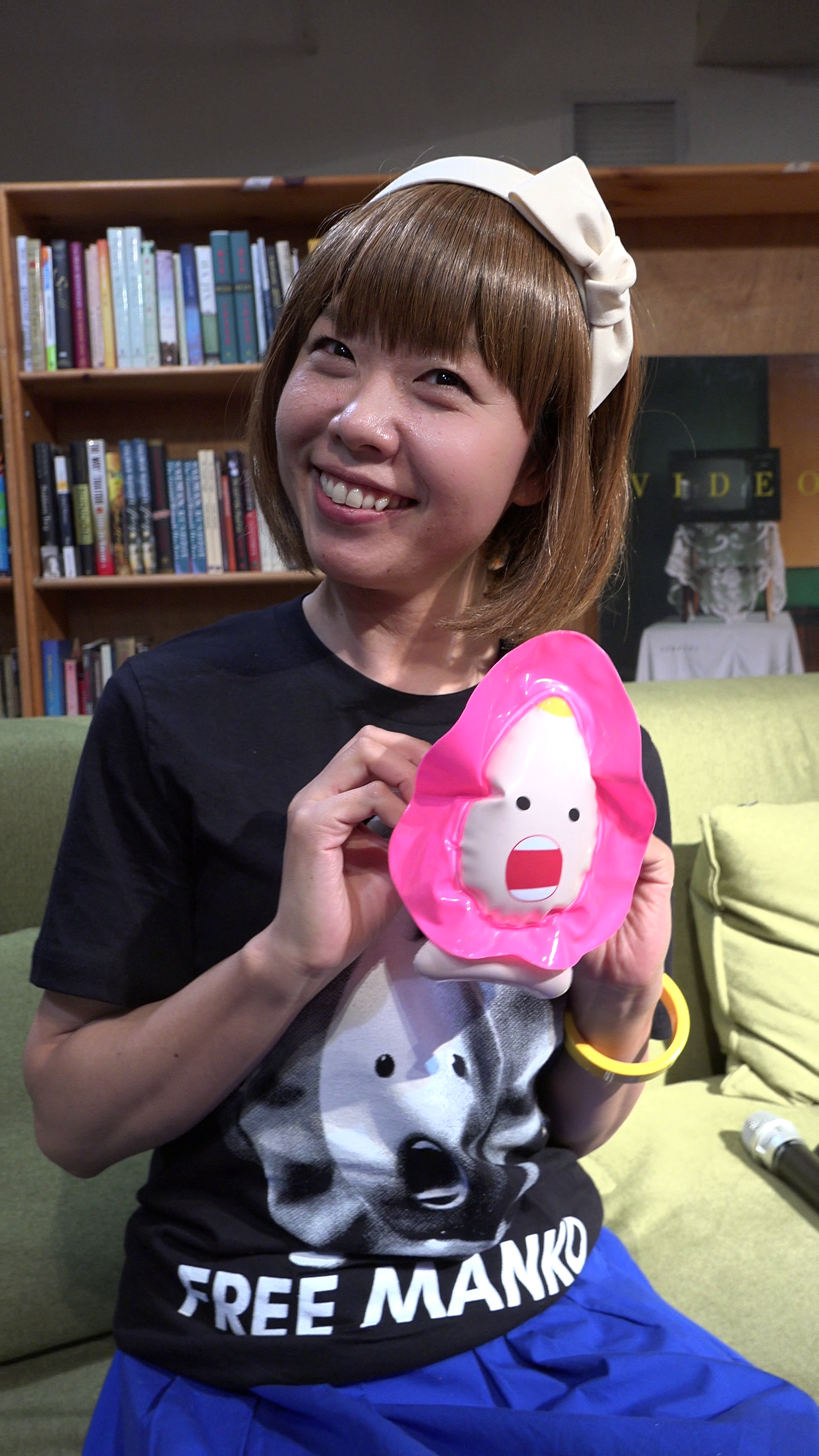
- Igarashi in 2016, with a toy depicting her character Manko-chan
- Born: 14 March 1972 (age 54)
- Other name: Rokudenashiko (Japanese: ろくでなし子 / 碌でなし子 "Little Reprobate")
- Education: Kokugakuin University
- Occupations: Japanese sculptor and manga artist
- Known for: Using her vulva in works of art
- Notable work: "Deco Man", a series of decorated vulva molds; "Manko-chan", a cartoon vulva character; "Man-Boat", a kayak modeled on a 3D scan of her own vulva
- Spouse: Mike Scott

Megumi Igarashi (五十嵐恵, Igarashi Megumi; born March 14, 1972), who uses the pseudonym Rokudenashiko (ろくでなし子 or 碌でなし子), is a Japanese sculptor and manga artist who creates works that feature female genitalia and are often modeled after her own vulva. Rokudenashiko considers it her mission to reclaim female genitalia as part of women's bodies and demystify them in Japan's male dominated society, where she believes that they are "overly hidden" and marginalized as “taboo” and “obscene” in comparison to phallic imagery. As such, the artist has created a variety of different representations of manko, the Japanese slang for vagina or pussy, using representations of her own body as the raw material to emphasize as return to experience within art and manga. Rokudenashiko has been called an international symbol of “manko positivity.”

The self-ascribed pseudonym Rokudenashiko translates to “good-for-nothing-girl,” a descriptive term created by combining rokudenashi (which translates to “good-for-nothing,” “bastard,” “ne’er-do-well”) and the diminutive feminine suffix -ko (usually translated as “girl” or “child”).

In 2014, Rokudenashiko was arrested following the creation of Man-Boat (short for manko boat), a kayak with an opening attachment modeled after a 3-D scan of her own vulva, for which she drew financial support from an online crowdfunding platform. Accused on the grounds of posting the downloadable 3-D scanned digital data of her vulva for the public as part of her crowdfunding campaign, Rokudenashiko became the first woman in Japanese history tried on the grounds of obscenity. The ensuing legal battle attracted much media attention, both within Japan and internationally, whereby the artist amassed public support and became the subject of online protests about Japan's inconsistent obscenity laws. In 2016, Rokudenashiko was fined 400,000 yen (around US$3,660) for making the data publicly available.

== Education and early career ==
Rokudenashiko studied Philosophy at the Kokugakuin University in Tokyo. After graduation, she began to work in the manga industry and was awarded a new artist award from the publisher Kodansha in 1998.

Despite this achievement, the artist was discouraged by the industry's competitive dependency on reader surveys, and eventually found work at a publisher that specialized in the genre of "experiential reportage" (Japanese: 体験ルポ, romanized: taiken rupo), also known as reality manga. The artist has explained that this work has formed the basis for her sculptural artworks—the genre relies on life experience as the source material for manga, using first person voice to depict real events through the eyes of the writer. Rokudenashiko has described her work as "literally putting real experiences into manga.”

== Manga and decorative works ==
Growing up in Japan, where women's genitalia are censored and stigmatized, Rokudenashiko has described how she had never seen other women's genitalia and did not know what they should look like, and was therefore concerned from a young age that her own vulva was abnormal. She decided to make a plaster cast of her own vulva to understand what it looked like and started to make related artworks using this mold. She claims that women should be able to speak about their bodies without shame, the artist arguing that the vulva should be a "part of the body...no different from arms or legs". She hopes to make the vulva something that is "casual and pop," declaring that in Japan, the "vagina is treated like it's something underground and hidden, so I want to industrialize and mass-produce it."

When Rokudenashiko first began to use a mold of her vulva to create artworks, she treated the idea light-heartedly. However, after receiving a lot of criticism and backlash, she began to use her art as a statement and form of protest. In her book documenting her legal battles (see section below), she wrote: “Since I’ve started my work in manko art, I’ve been fighting back against the old men who complain about it…I’ve decided to keep making even more ridiculous work, with all seriousness. Though this was kind of a joke at first, now I am joking around with every ounce of my body and soul.”

Many of Rokudenashiko's artworks have been confiscated during police raids in 2014 and 2015, but photographs document her body of work.

=== Deco Man sculptural work ===
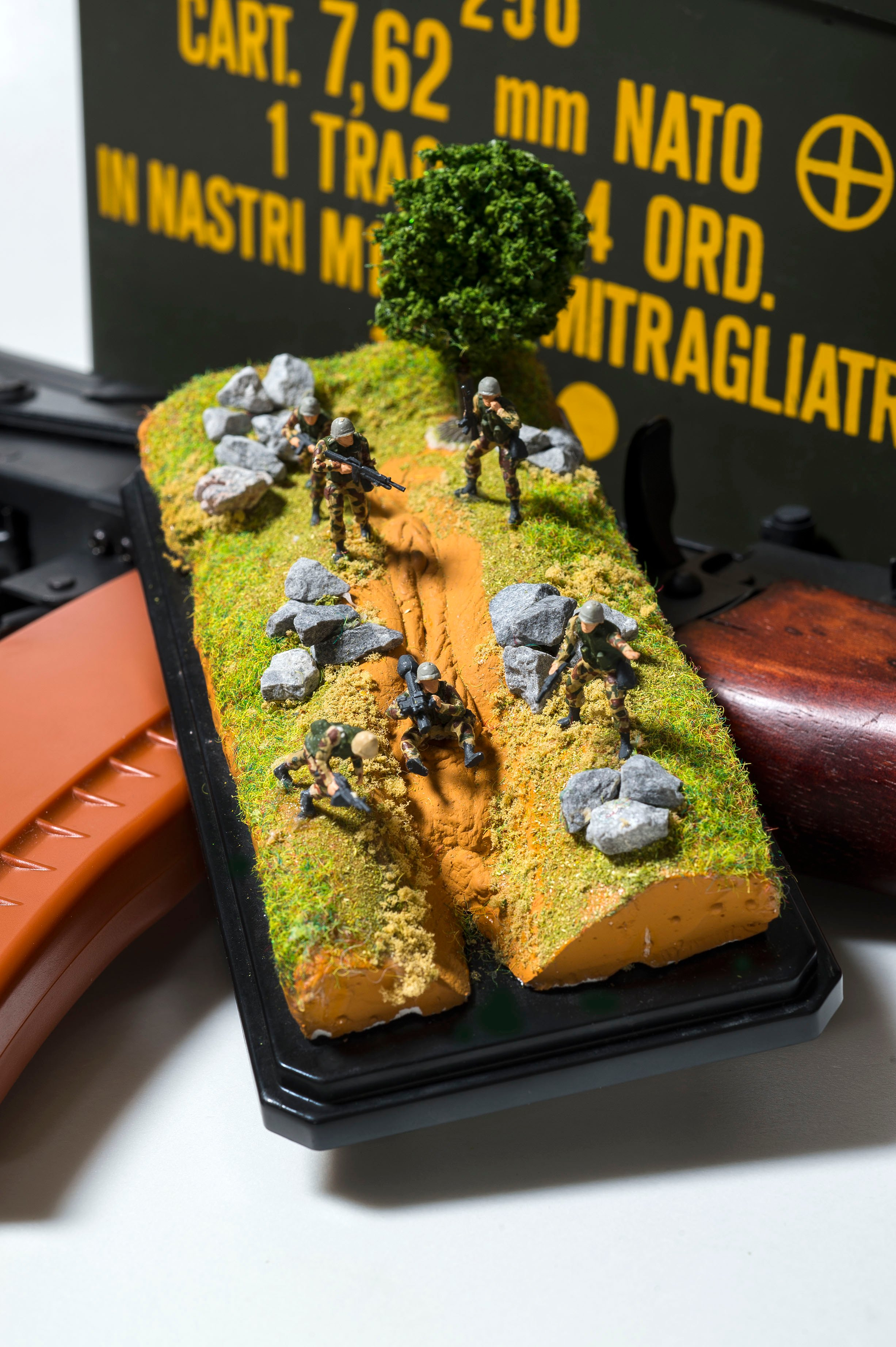
Photo of the "Battlefield Manko" sculpture by Megumi Igarashi

Since Rokudenashiko was not exposed to many realistic depictions of women's genitalia, she decided to mold a plaster cast of her own vulva to understand the reality of what it looked like. Rokudenashiko felt that the plaster mold was too plain so she began to decorate them, creating an ongoing series she refers to as Deco Man (a play on “decoration” and “manko”). She has used the mold to create many casts of her vulva, including a series of dioramas that draw on 19th century landscape paintings by turning the form of her own genitalia into the grounds for various landscapes—moonscapes, beaches, golf courses, riverbeds, as well as rustic cottage and church settings, among others. In these tediously crafted dioramas, Rokudenashiko brings the vaginal form out of its hidden setting, positing it as a setting for the world.

The artist has created many more vulva-themed works, including dioramas, a chandelier, lampshades, tissue covers, a remote control car, necklaces, iPhone cases. She creates a variety of these Deco Man objects under the category of nado, or etcetera.

=== Deco Man manga ===
In 2012, Rokudenashiko published a reportage style manga entitled Deco Man that documented the complicated relationship she has with her own body and the artist's process of starting to create her vulva-themed artistic creations. The manga is structured as seven fairy tales in the mode of a shōjo manga, documenting Rokudenashiko's own artistic formation through the main character's struggles with body insecurity and inadequacy that pushed her to get plastic surgery on her labia. The main character comes to the conclusion that many other women are plagued with the same anxieties, and starts to help herself and other women by creating Deco Man sculptures and leading workshops for making manko art.

=== Manko-chan ===
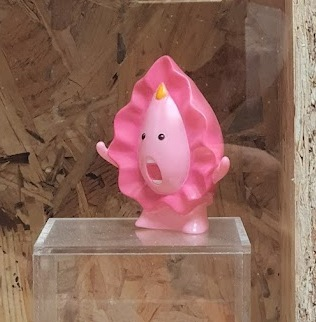
A figurine of Manko-chan made by Igurashi on display in the Vagina Museum in London.

Rokudenashiko also created her signature cartoon character Manko-chan (the effeminate suffix -chan added as an endearing way to refer to the manko, often translated into English as Miss Pussy or Cute Little Pussy). Manko-chan is a cute, personified manko with two legs and a labia articulated like a mane around a simple yet expressive face that includes a characteristic yellow clitoral “third eye.” Manko-chan is featured on the cover of Rokudenashiko's 2016 book What is Obscenity?, and has been featured in the artist's newsletter, website, as well as the autographed photos she passes out at book signings and other events. Manko-chan is also purchasable as a sticker set for her fans, and has been made into plastic figurines, a plush doll, and a full-size costume.

=== Web museum ===
Rokudenashiko's virtual museum

In February 2023, Rokudenashiko established 6d745 Software, a company aimed at creating art pieces utilizing AI and web technologies. Later in June of the same year, she unveiled the "Rokudenashiko Museum", a web-based virtual museum accessible via browsers, at an exhibition in Art Lab TOKYO. Within the museum, visitors can interact with characters in a 3D environment to view and comment on art pieces. Additionally, the museum offers a role-playing experience titled "Detention Game", which is based on her personal experiences. Rokudenashiko has expressed that her goal is that the "Museum provides a fun and cutting-edge alternative to the art industry's existing bias towards physical-world museums"

== Man-Boat (2014) and legal battle ==
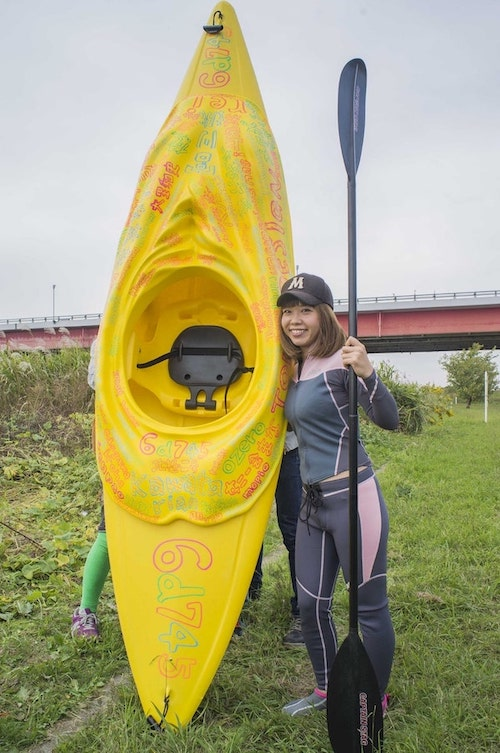
Photo of the "Manko kayak" sculpture by Megumi Igarashi

In 2013, Rokudenashiko was inspired to make a larger sculptural work through the use of 3-D printing. She considered making a door and a car, before settling on a kayak, inspired by the connection between female sexuality and the sea. She decided to create Man-Boat (short for manko boat), enlisting help from the public via the crowdfunding platform “Campfire” to create an attachment to mount on the cockpit of a 2-meter yellow kayak modeled from a 3-D scan of her own vulva. The crowdfunding platform was online from June 18 - September 6, 2013 and raised ¥1 million (194% of its total goal) from 125 people. With their support, Rokudenashiko went forward with her project, spending the rest of the year creating Man-Boat, the process of which she documented in detail on her blog.

In March 2014, Rokudenashiko successfully sailed Man-Boat down the Tama River in Tokyo (the artist referred to it as the Ta-manko River). That same month, the artist emailed the downloadable 3-D scanned data of her vulva to the 65 crowdfund supporters who had contributed ¥3,000 or more to her campaign, and gave a CD-ROM with the data to 17 others. She claimed that she distributed this data to encourage people to use the data to make their own original genitalia artwork.

=== First arrest ===
On July 12, 2014, Rokudenashiko was arrested for alleged violation of Article 175 of the criminal code for distributing obscene data, becoming the first woman in Japanese history tried on the grounds of obscenity. She spent a week in a Tokyo women's prison for the alleged violation of obscenity laws. Her arrest launched a frenzy of media attention about Rokudenashiko, her work, and images of the artist sailing the Man Boat in question down the Tama River; this surge in press led to an international outcry of support for the artist. More than 21,000 people worldwide signed an online petition on Change.org urging the government to free her immediately. She was released on July 18, 2014, after having successfully appealed her detention. Following her release, Rokudenashiko created a manga that satirized the police after her first arrest. After her second arrest, she suggested “[the police] trumped up some charges and arrested me in December” for releasing the work.

=== Second arrest ===
The artist was arrested again at an exhibition of her diorama manko works at a sex shop on December 3, 2014, alongside the owner of the shop, writer and feminist activist Watanabe Minori (who uses the pseudonym of Kitahara Minori). Watanabe was later released. After almost a month in jail, Rokudenashiko was indicted on December 24 for three separate counts of violating Japan's obscenity law: "obscenity display", "obscenity electromagnetic record", and "obscenity electromagnetic recording medium distribution." She pleaded not-guilty and was released on bail on December 28.

=== Trial ===
Rokudenashiko's trial began 14 April 2015 in Tokyo District Court. The trial served as a venue for the artist to challenge the double standard on representations of male bodies in comparison to female's bodies. The artist's defense was built around the claim that Man Boat was a work of art rather than a pornographic or erotic image. As shared with the creative agency MASSIVE in an interview, Rokudenashiko's full statement to the court was as follows:

“I make fun, cheerful things that attempt to overturn prevailing perceptions of female genitalia. I’ve attempted to make things specifically for supporters of my work, but was then indicted and arrested, as you know. While I find the whole ordeal absurd, it is precisely because of my arrest that so many more people have been able to think more seriously about the perception of female genitals and of their right to a freedom of expression, which is ultimately a good thing. And yet, I have absolutely no idea what makes the three pieces for which I’ve been indicted, crimes of obscenity, why other works haven’t been deemed obscene. It has become impossible to establish a standard (of so-called obscenity), and this case will shut down any opportunity I may have in the future, to create other similar work. I am also financially challenged. If there continues to be no fair criteria, museums will be less inclined to hang challenging art or work by similar artists, and the arts as an institution will become closed minded. I am convinced of my innocence and I believe the court is capable of viewing the situation with fairness. I beg of you consider my circumstances.”

Man Boat (and many other artworks) were confiscated and held as evidence over the course of the trial. At its height, Rokudenashiko could have faced up to two years in jail and fines up to ¥2.5 million (around US$25,000), but the prosecution later stated an intent to seek a fine of ¥800,000 (around US$7,800) and no jail time.

During the trial Rokudenashiko spoke out about her situation many times, explaining her perspective to the public and incorporating her legal battle into her artworks. This included attending a press meeting of the Foreign Correspondents’ Club of Japan in a widely circulated address, as well as giving an address when she won the second place prize in the Tokyo Designers Week Art Fair. She playfully mocked the police in her address at the Art Fair, saying "If I had not been arrested, I could not have spread my activities in this way, I would not have been invited to this event and I could not have let the contemporary art world know the name of Rokudenashiko. I really appreciate all the police’s support."

=== Verdict ===
On 8 May 2016, the court handed down a rare, mixed decision: Rokudenashiko was found not guilty of the charges related to the kayak, on the grounds that the sculpture, with its bright color and decoration, "did not immediately suggest female anatomy", in the words of the BBC report. However, the artist was found guilty of the charges related to the 3D data, and was fined ¥400,000 (roughly US$3,660), about half what the prosecution had suggested was appropriate. Rokudenashiko and her legal team immediately vowed to appeal.

=== Appeal ===
The appeal of Rokudenashiko‘s ¥400,000 fine was unsuccessful, bringing an end to the case in 2017.

== Domestic and international media attention ==
A clip from Queer Japan featuring Rokudenashiko discussing her art.

Rokudenashiko's case drew international attention. Many disputes about women's rights, artistic freedom, censorship, and double standards in Japan emerged due to Igarashi's arrests. After the announcement of the verdict for her second arrest, more than 1,000 tweeted expressing anger and questioning the logic of the court. Many felt that there was a blatant double standard in the manner in which Japan's obscenity laws functioned; a widespread example, especially among those living outside Japan, was that male genitalia are shown at shrines and festivals (such as the Kanamara penis festival), while women's genitalia in an object as innocent as a kayak could be grounds for arrest. The Daily Show host Jon Stewart noted that in Japan, female reproductive organs remain taboo while there is a festival dedicated to the penis. An article in The Guardian inquired, "how can it be OK for comics to publish underage pornography but illegal to invite people to 3D scan your vagina?"

The documentary film #Female Pleasure follows Igarashi during the trial. The film is about five women, including her, fighting social taboos regarding female sexuality.

== Personal life ==
The artist married Mike Scott, the frontman of Scottish folk rock band The Waterboys, in October 2016. Their first child, a son, was born on 2 February 2017.

== Books ==
- Rokudenashiko, ワイセツって何ですか？[Waisetsu’tte nandesuka? What is Obscenity?] (Tokyo: Kinyōbi, 2015).
- Rokudenashiko, 私の体がワイセツ?!女のそこだけなぜタブー [Watashi no karada ga waisetsu?! Onna no soko dake naze tabū, My Body Is Obscene?!: Why Is Only My Lady Part Taboo?], (Tokyo: Chikuma Shobō, 2015).
- Rokudenashiko, What is Obscenity? The Story of a Good for Nothing Artist and Her Pussy (Koyama Press, 2016), English Translation by A. Ishii (ISBN 978-1-927-668-31-3)

== Exhibitions ==
2012

- Deco Man Exhibition, Ginza Vanilla-Mania, Tokyo, Japan

2014

- Let's play with Manko! Manko Exhibition, Shinjuku Ophthalmologist （Ganka）Gallery, Tokyo, Japan

2016

- Feminism Fan in Japan and Friends, Youkobo Art Space, Tokyo
- SCHAM 100 GRÜNDE, ROT ZU WERDEN, DHMD Museum of Art, Dresden, Germany

2020

- BURST Generation: Death and SEX, Shinjuku Ophthalmologist （Ganka）Gallery, Tokyo, Japan
- COMIC SALON, Museum for Communication Berlin, Berlin, Germany
- COMIC SALON, Erika Fuchs Haus, Schwarzenbach an der Saale, Germany

2021

- Bijyutsu VAGINA, Kyoto KUNST ARZT, Kyoto, Japan

2022

- COMIC SALON ERLANGEN, Erlangen, Germany

2023

- It’s not here - Considerations on Reality as Virtual Universe, ArtLabTokyo, Tokyo, Japan

== See also ==
- Feminist art
- Jamie McCartney, an artist known for the Great Wall of Vagina
- Vulva activism
