= Kat Banyard =

British author and activist (born 1982)

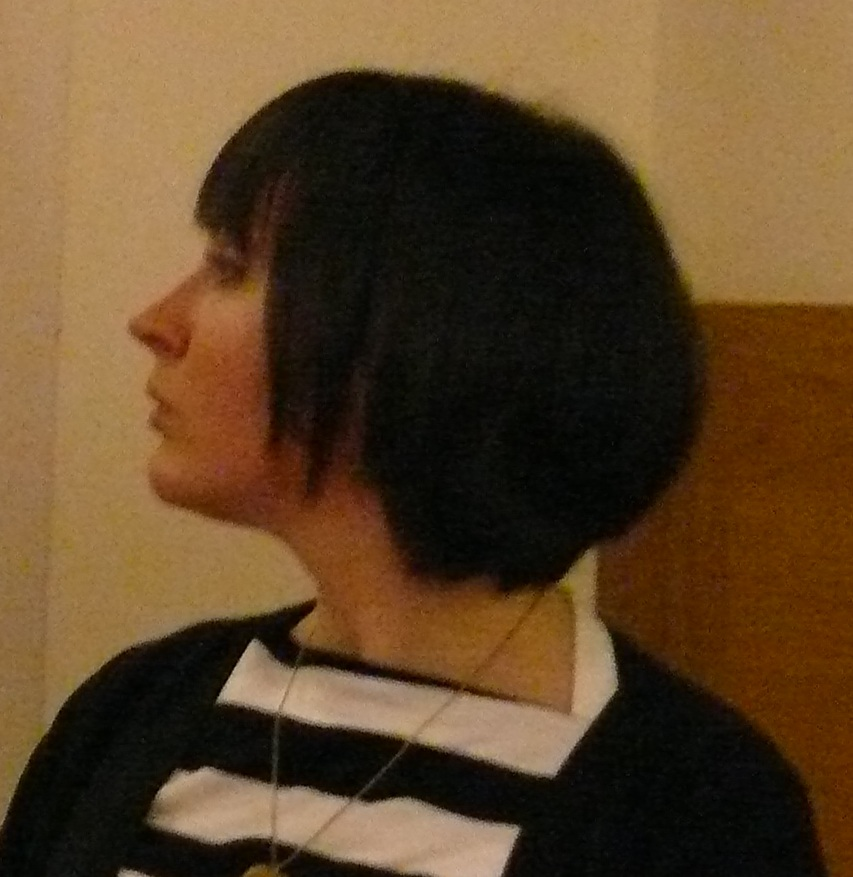
- Kat Banyard in 2010
- Born: 1982 (age 43–44)
- Occupation: Writer
- Known for: Feminism

Kat Banyard (born 1982) is a British author and activist against sexual inequality. She is the co-founder and former director of UK Feminista, a feminist pressure group whose campaigns have included Lose the Lads Mags, and the author of two books on feminist topics. She has also made appearances on UK television channels discussing feminist topics. Banyard's work is critical of choice feminism, the beauty industry and the sex industry, which she describes as "commercial sexual exploitation". In 2010, Kira Cochrane, writing for The Guardian, called Banyard "the UK's most influential young feminist".

== Career ==
While at university in Sheffield, in 2004 Banyard set up FEM Conferences, a conference designed to bring together a range of campaign groups and activists working on gender equality to build communications, as well as educate people about gender discrimination. In a profile with The Observer, Banyard said she set up the conference because she "wanted to be able to go somewhere to be inspired and there wasn't anything like it". Banyard worked at the Fawcett Society until 2010 as Campaigns Officer. In 2010 Banyard founded UK Feminista.

Banyard's first book,The Equality Illusion: The Truth about Women and Men Today was published in 2010. Observer published a critical review, arguing that while its subject matter is important, the book is poorly written and infantilises women.

Her second book, Pimp State: Sex, Money and the Future of Equality, was published in 2016. Pimp State posits that prostitution is at risk of becoming normalised, and critiques the idea that sexual equality and the sex industry can coexist. The book was reviewed positively by Helen Lewis in New Statesman and Sarah Ditum in Guardian. Financial Times described the book as "punchy and breezily written". Charlotte Shane wrote a critical review in The Spectator, claiming the book misrepresents the views of those who support decriminalisation of the sex industry and excludes the perspectives of women who sell sex.

== Bibliography ==
- The Equality Illusion: The Truth about Women and Men Today. London: Faber and Faber, 2010. ISBN 0571246273.
- Pimp State: Sex, Money and the Future of Equality. London: Faber and Faber, 2016. ISBN 0571278221.
