= Jamie McCartney =

British artist

- Born: Jamie Howard McCartney; 9 October 1975; London, England
- Education: Hartford, Connecticut, London
- Known for: sculpture, scanography, design
- Notable work: The Great Wall of Vagina – 2011
- Movement: Bronze sculpture, plaster sculpture, lifecasting, modernism, surrealism, assemblage

Jamie McCartney (born 1975) is a professional artist working in many disciplines who lives in Brighton, England. Maintaining that the naked body is still a controversial subject, he is most famous for his ten-panelled wall sculpture The Great Wall of Vagina, comprising plaster casts taken from 400 volunteers' genitals. Often using the body as inspiration he works with both traditional and novel materials and processes, he explores the human condition and themes of religion, sexuality and death.

== Education and early career ==
Jamie McCartney trained at Hartford Art School (USA), graduating with a Bachelor of Fine Art summa cum laude in Experimental Studio Art in 1991. After graduation he returned to London where he worked for 4 years for antiques importer, David Wainwright, eventually becoming a buyer for him in India and Pakistan.

McCartney then took an HND in model making at Barking College and worked for several London model making companies such as Complete Fabrication and Gavin Lyndsey. He then set up a model making partnership, Gordon & McCartney, specialising in architectural and exhibition models as well as TV props and provided the art department for TV series "Renford Rejects". They also worked on the development of many of the Millennium Dome zones, most significantly the Body Zone with designers HPICM and architects Branson Coates.

In early 1999 he left the partnership to establish a forge in Hackney, London to fulfill a public art commission he had won (a series of abstract farm animal sculptures in steel for Egham town centre, in Surrey). Later that year he again became involved in the Body Zone, helping to sculpt the interiors to resemble oversized body parts. This led to his move into the film industry, working as a sculptor and prop maker. He was frequently employed by Special Effects UK and Asylum, working on films such as Black Hawk Down, Charlotte Gray and The Hitchhiker's Guide to the Galaxy. He also worked directly on films such as Around the World in 80 Days, V for Vendetta and Casino Royale. His last film was Mein Fuhrer shot at Babelsberg studios in Berlin.

McCartney has exhibited work in numerous solo and group shows. He is the founder and the owner of Brighton Body Casting, a commercial lifecasting studio. He is also the founder and chairman of The Sussex Artists Club.

== Work ==
The main body of McCartney's work has been three-dimensional, often experimental in approach and frequently sociopolitical. Lately he has turned to photographic collage, creating life size body portraits using his own experimental methods.

McCartney won his second public award for his pedal-powered road car Car-Bon Miles at the UK's first Art Car Parade.

In 2008, McCartney, based at JAG Gallery, Brighton, auctioned off a sculpture of a death mask of his father's face as part of the Men Only exhibition which raised £500 for prostate cancer charity Everyman. McCartney called the piece "After". He was quoted as saying,"I’d never done anything like this before, but I wanted to address how I was feeling after my father’s death and reflect it in my art".

The Great Wall of Vagina comprises 400 plaster casts of vulvas arranged in ten panels; the polyptych spans nine meters in length. According to McCartney, the idea was sparked by the trend for the "designer vagina", where women resort to cosmetic surgery for a certain look. It was exhibited in Berlin in September 2008, and the following month in Brighton. (See Vagina and vulva in art.)

His collection "Skin Deep", first shown at The Hay Hill Gallery on London's Cork Street, focuses on notions of beauty and sexuality. His two photographic series "Physical Photography" and "The Sum of Our Parts", concentrate again on the human form, using a document scanner to create a body image in abstract form. The artist refers to this as Neo-Cubism.

McCartney also creates more conceptual pieces. His Messages in Bottles relied on chance and the collaboration of strangers to bring to fruition. His experimental "Sculptography" collaboration with photographer Miss Aniela is a further example of his experimental work, as is his "Scanography" series. In addition he is frequently commissioned to create one-off designs of furniture etc. for business and private clients, with the help of a large team of student volunteers under his name.

== Public artworks ==
- Farm Animals, Egham, UK, 1999
- Car-bon-miles, in the UK's first Art Car Parade, Manchester 2007

== See also ==
- Megumi Igarashi
