= Tee Corinne =

American artist

- Born: Linda Tee Athelston Cutchin; November 3, 1943; St. Petersburg, Florida, U.S.
- Died: August 27, 2006 (aged 62); Sunny Valley, Oregon, U.S.
- Occupations: Photographer; visual artist; writer; activist
- Known for: Cunt Coloring Book
- Partner: Beverly Anne Brown

Tee A. Corinne (November 3, 1943 – August 27, 2006) was an American photographer, author, and editor notable for the portrayal of sexuality in her artwork. According to Completely Queer: The Gay and Lesbian Encyclopedia, "Corinne is one of the most visible and accessible lesbian artists in the world."

== Early life and education ==
Linda Tee Athelston Cutchin was born in St. Petersburg, Florida, to Thomas Barnes Cutchin and Marjorie Isabelle Meares. She grew up in Florida and North Carolina. In 1945, when Corinne was two years old, her parents got divorced. One year later, her mother remarried William T. McClellan. The two were alcoholics, which would later influence Corinne's mixed media show "Family: Growing Up in an Alcoholic Family."

At age three-and-a-half, Corinne was diagnosed with tuberculosis. She spent three months recovering in a nursing home and nineteen months with her grandparents in Yankeetown, Florida, where she grew to love country living. She was not permitted to resume normal activity until age eight.

Corinne's mother was also an artist. She introduced Corinne to the basic principles and techniques for making visual art. According to Corinne, "I have seldom succeeded in keeping a diary, but I have almost always carried a drawing pad, and since my eighth year, I have also had a camera."

As a teenager, Corinne became aware that she was attracted to both men and women. At boarding school in Ft. Lauderdale, Florida, she discovered that she thrived in an academically and artistically rigorous environment. At graduation, she won the school’s art award and a National Journalism award for work on the school newspaper.

Corinne spent her first year of college (1962–63) studying art at Newcomb College in New Orleans, LA, where she studied painting with Ida Kohlmeyer. She then transferred back to Florida, where she earned a B.A. in printmaking and painting (with minors in English and history) from University of South Florida. She graduated in 1965.

In 1966, she married Robert Kamen who she says was her "best friend." Corinne went on to get an M.F.A. in drawing and sculpture at Pratt Institute in 1968. After a few years of teaching and backpacking in Europe, she became attracted to the back-to-the-land movement and communal living. She was also, in her words, sliding into suicidal depression. She stopped making art when she and Kamen moved to San Francisco in 1972. She changed her life, writing, "I found therapy, separated from my husband, became involved with women, and joined with the Women’s Movement. I felt better".

She publicly came out as a lesbian in 1975 with her then-partner, Honey Lee Cottrell. They remained together until 1977.

== Career ==
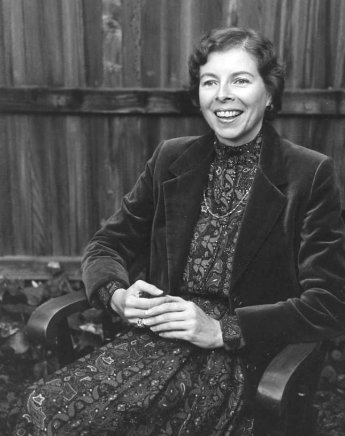
Photo of Ann Bannon taken in 1983 by Corinne.

Corinne began exhibiting and publishing art and writing in the mid-1960s.

Her first notable work was in 1975, and is still in print today. Aged 27, she realized that although her art education had enabled her to depict male genitals, she had not observed her own since she was a child. "I knew that the things we don't have names for, or images of, are the ones we label crazy or bad. I believed that reclaiming labial imagery was a route to claiming personal power for women." She decided to produce artistic images of vulvas, and self-published the Cunt Coloring Book, reclaiming the word "cunt"; it was later issued by a publisher as Labiaflowers.

She was a co-facilitator of the Feminist Photography Ovulars (1979–1981) and a co-founder of The Blatant Image, A Magazine of Feminist Photography (1981–1983). She was the author of one novel, three collections of short stories, four books of poetry and numerous artists books and small edition publications.

In 1980, she was one of the ten invited artists whose work was exhibited in the Great American Lesbian Art Show.

She became adept at representing lesbian sexuality in ways that would elude the male gaze. In 1982, she produced a series of photographs called Yantras of Womanlove. Concerned with protecting the privacy of her models, she used techniques involving multiple prints, solarization, images printed in negative, and multiple exposures. Tee consistently and conscientiously included women of color, large women, older women, and women with disabilities as her subjects. Sometimes printers would refuse to print her works and art galleries would refuse to show it.

Corinne was also an author, writing many fiction novels with lesbian themes. Corinne wrote about art for a variety of publications and, from 1987, was the art books columnist for Feminist Bookstore News. A co-founder and past co-chair of the Gay & Lesbian Caucus (an affiliated society of the College Art Association), she also co-founded the Women's Caucus for Art Lesbian & Bisexual Caucus. Her work is associated with the international women in print movement, which sought to establish autonomous communications networks of feminist publications, presses, and bookstores created by and for women. At the inaugural National Feminist Bookstore Week in 1995, Corinne signed a "feminist writer's pledge" acknowledging the importance of feminist and lesbian publishing ventures, along with Jewelle Gomez, Dorothy Allison, Alice Walker, and Blanche McCrary Boyd.

In 1989, Corinne received a Lambda Literary Award in the lesbian anthology category for her editing of Intricate Passions (published by Banned Books). In 1991, she was chosen by Lambda Book Report as one of the fifty most influential lesbians and gay men of the decade, and in 1997 she received the Women's Caucus for Art President's Award for service to women in the arts.

One of her other best known works is the cover of the 1993 self-titled debut album of the English alternative rock band Suede. In 1998, her photographs appeared on the cover and sleeve of the timmi-kat ReCoRDS' release, "Milkshake: A CD to Benefit The Harvey Milk Institute".

== Personal life ==
In the early 1980s, Tee Corinne moved to southern Oregon after she developed strong personal and artistic connections to the state. She lived in the many women's communities springing up in the area. As she notes in one of her manuscripts, "Slowly, in Oregon, I reconnected with the deep levels of creativity that run in me and began producing work which pleased me."

In the early 1980s, Corinne was in an on-and-off relationship with Caroline Overman. Corinne says this of the relationship and the art she made during it: "The relationship was wildly sexual and, at least to me, the pictures I made of us together, nude in hotel and motel rooms, convey this quality." In the mid 1980s, she dated lesbian literary author, Lee Lynch.

From the years 1989 to 2005, she was in a relationship with Beverly Anne Brown. In 2003, Brown was diagnosed with cancer, which led to Corinne's series "Cancer in our Lives" (2003–05) in which she photographed Brown before and after surgeries in order to demystify the results. Brown died in 2005.

== Death and legacy ==
Corinne died in Sunny Valley, Oregon, on August 27, 2006, from liver cancer. She was 62 years old.

Corinne donated her papers to the University of Oregon Libraries' Special Collections and University Archives, where they are now available for research. The collection includes correspondence, literary manuscripts, artwork, photographs, artifacts, and other documents that reflect Corinne's life and work. Moonforce Media created the Tee A. Corinne Prize for Lesbian Media Artists in 2006 to annually honor Corinne as an artist with bold vision and a fierce dedication to encouraging and preserving lesbian art. The award is an unrestricted grant of up to $1,000 annually. The prize is dedicated to artists working in photography, film, video, digital media, new media, or any fusions of these forms and in any genre including documentary, narrative, experimental, or any other styles or combination of genres. The award furthers Corinne's wish that individual lesbian artists be financially supported to work independently and without censorship.

In 2014, Corinne was included prominently in a 45-year retrospective on LGBT photography on the website of news station KQED.

In 2015 the Golden Crown Literary Society awarded the first Tee Corinne Outstanding Cover Design award to Ann McMan for her work on the book Everything.

In 2016, Lesbian News published a laudatory editorial retrospective on Corinne's life.

The book A Forest Fire Between Us by Charlotte Flint was published in 2025. It is a collection of some of Corinne’s work and associated ephemera.

== Bibliography ==
=== Books ===
- "Bodies: A Collage", in woman in power (Issue 18, 70-72)
- Courting Pleasure (Austin, TX: Banned Books, 1994.)
- The Cunt Coloring Book. San Francisco: Pearlchild, 1975; San Francisco: Last Gasp, 1988. Also published as Labiaflowers. Tallahassee, FL: Naiad Press, 1981.
- Drawing as a Problem-Solving Activity (2002)
- Dreams of the Woman Who Loved Sex (Austin, TX: Banned Books, 1987)
- Family: About Growing Up in an Alcoholic Family. North Vancouver, BC: Gallerie, 1990.
- Lesbian Muse: The Women Behind the Words. Portland, OR: Chance Publications, 1989.
- The Little Houses on Women's Land (2002)
- Lovers: Love and Sex Stories (Austin, TX: Banned Books, 1989)
- The Sex Lives of Daffodils: Growing Up as an Artist Who Also Writes. Wolf Creek, OR: Pearlchild 1994, 1997.
- The Sparkling Lavender Dust of Lust, A Novel (Austin, TX: Banned Books, 1991)
- Twenty-Two Years, 1970–1992. Wolf Creek, OR: Pearlchild, 1992.
- Wild Lesbian Roses: Essays on Art, Rural Living, and Creativity, 1986-1995, Wolf Creek, OR, Pearlchild, 1997.
- Women Who Loved Women. (Philadelphia, PA: Giovanni's Room, 1984)
- Yantras of Womanlove. Tallahassee, FL: Naiad Press, 1982.

=== Chapbooks ===
- At Six (1990)
- Joy Unfolds (1984)
- Visiting the Yarrow (1993)

=== Editor ===
- The Body of Love. (Austin, TX: Banned Books, 1993)
- Intricate Passions: A Collection of Erotic Short Fiction. (Austin, Texas: Banned Books, 1989)
- Lesbian Muse: The Women Behind the Words [Datebook] . (Austin, TX: Banned Books, 1990)
- Lesbian Photography on the U.S. West Coast 1972-1997 (1998)
- The Poetry of Sex: Lesbians Write the Erotic. (Austin, TX: Banned Books, 1992)
- Riding Desire: An Anthology of Erotic Writing. (Austin, TX: Banned Books, 1991)
