= Genital cutting =

Genital cutting refers to genital modification and mutilation of the human genitals using a cutting instrument. This terminology is often used in some literature specifically to avoid using the terms 'mutilation' or 'circumcision'. These practices can include:

- Castration
- Circumcision (male)
- Clitoridectomy
- Female genital mutilation (FGM)
- Penectomy
- Labiaplasty
- Penile subincision
- Penile superincision
- Sex reassignment of intersex children
- Vaginoplasty
