= Clitoral hood reduction =

Cosmetic surgical procedure

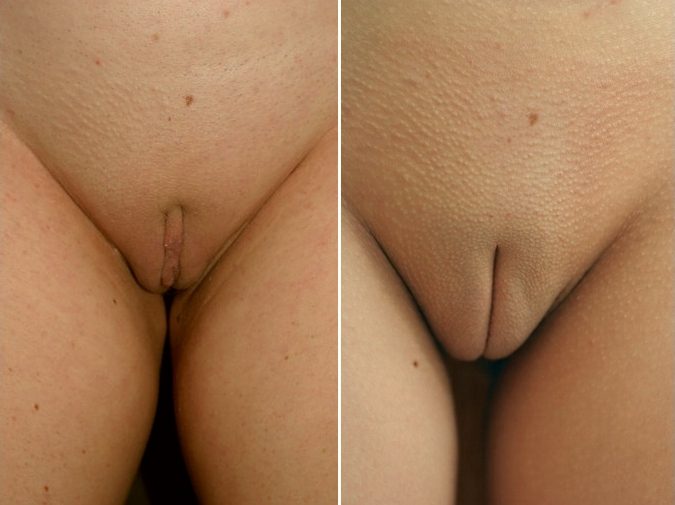
- Plastic surgical reduction of the clitoral hood (prepuce) for aesthetic reasons. Left: before, right: after the surgery.
- Specialty: Plastic surgeon

Clitoral hood reduction, also termed clitoral hoodectomy, clitoral unhooding, clitoridotomy, or (partial) hoodectomy, is a plastic surgery procedure (a form of vulvoplasty) for reducing the size and the area of the clitoral hood in order to further expose the glans of the clitoris.

It is usually performed as an elective cosmetic surgery meant to improve sexual satisfaction and to change the aesthetic appearance of the vulva. The reduction of the clitoral hood usually is done together with a labiaplasty that reduces the labia minora, and occasionally within a vaginoplasty.

Though patient surveys have indicated satisfaction with the outcome of such procedures, the American College of Obstetricians and Gynecologists cautioned in 2007 that for this type of vaginal surgeries, which are not medically indicated, women should be informed about the lack of data on their efficacy and potential complications.

== Surgical procedures ==
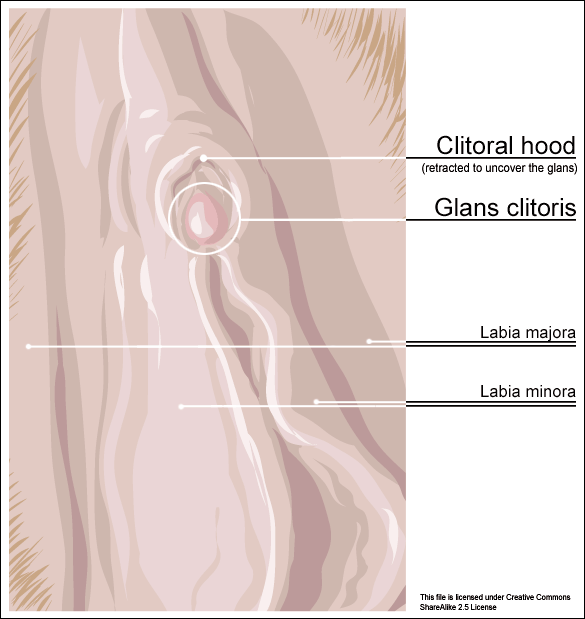
Pudendum femininum: The external anatomy of the vulvo-vaginal complex, indicating the clitoris, the clitoral prepuce, the labia majora, and the labia minora.

The procedures for labiaplasty occasionally include a clitoral hood reduction. One technique for reducing the clitoral hood is the bilateral excision (cutting) of the prepuce tissues covering the clitoral glans, with especial attention to maintaining the glans in the midline. Another technique cuts away (excises) the redundant folds of clitoral prepuce tissue, with incisions parallel to the long axis of the clitoris.

Clitoral hood reduction can be included in the extended wedge resection labiaplasty technique, wherein the extension of the exterior wedge sections is applied to reducing the prepuce tissues of the clitoral glans. Yet, occasionally excess prepuce-skin, in the center of the clitoral hood, is removed with separate incisions.

== Results ==
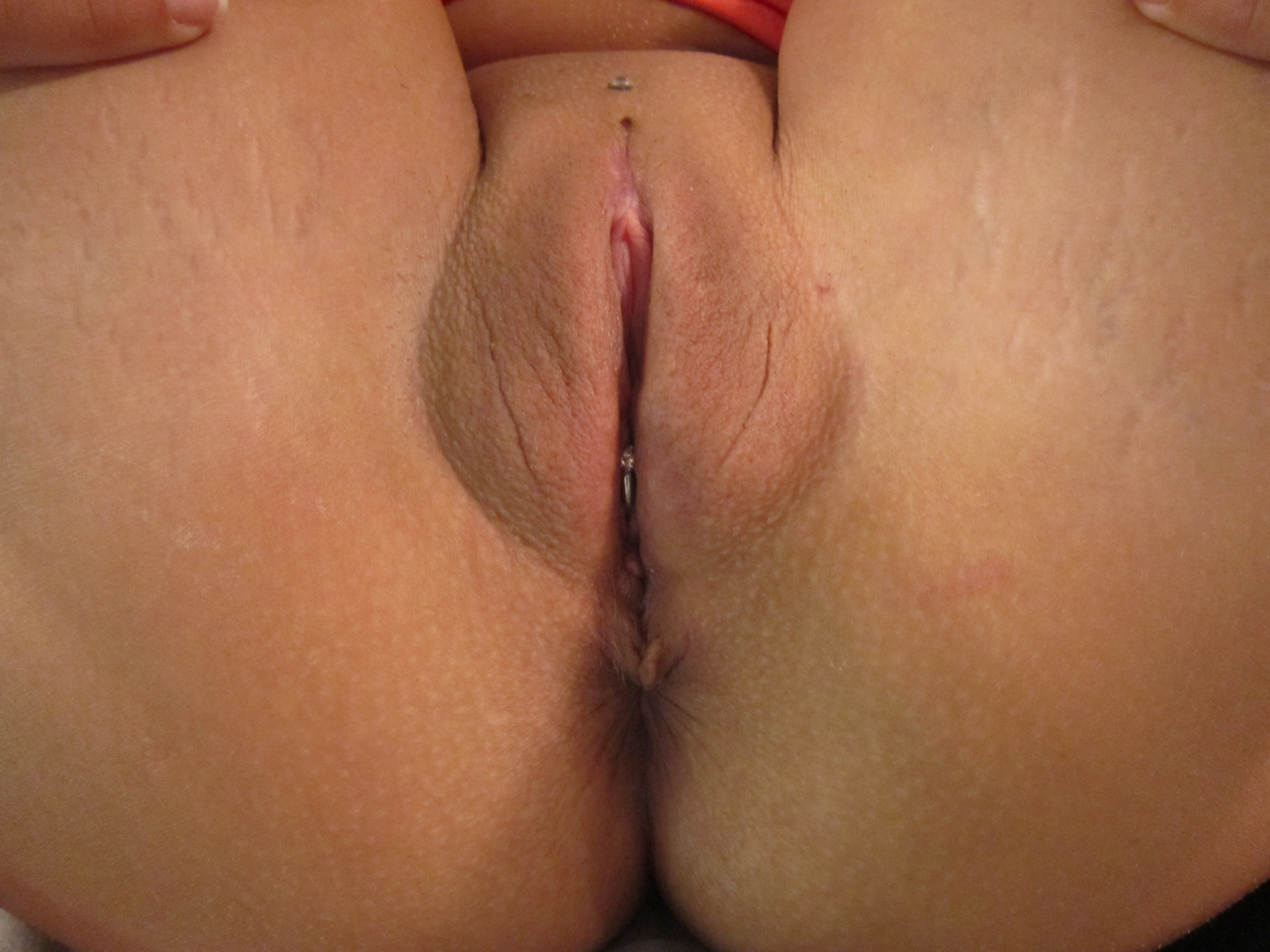
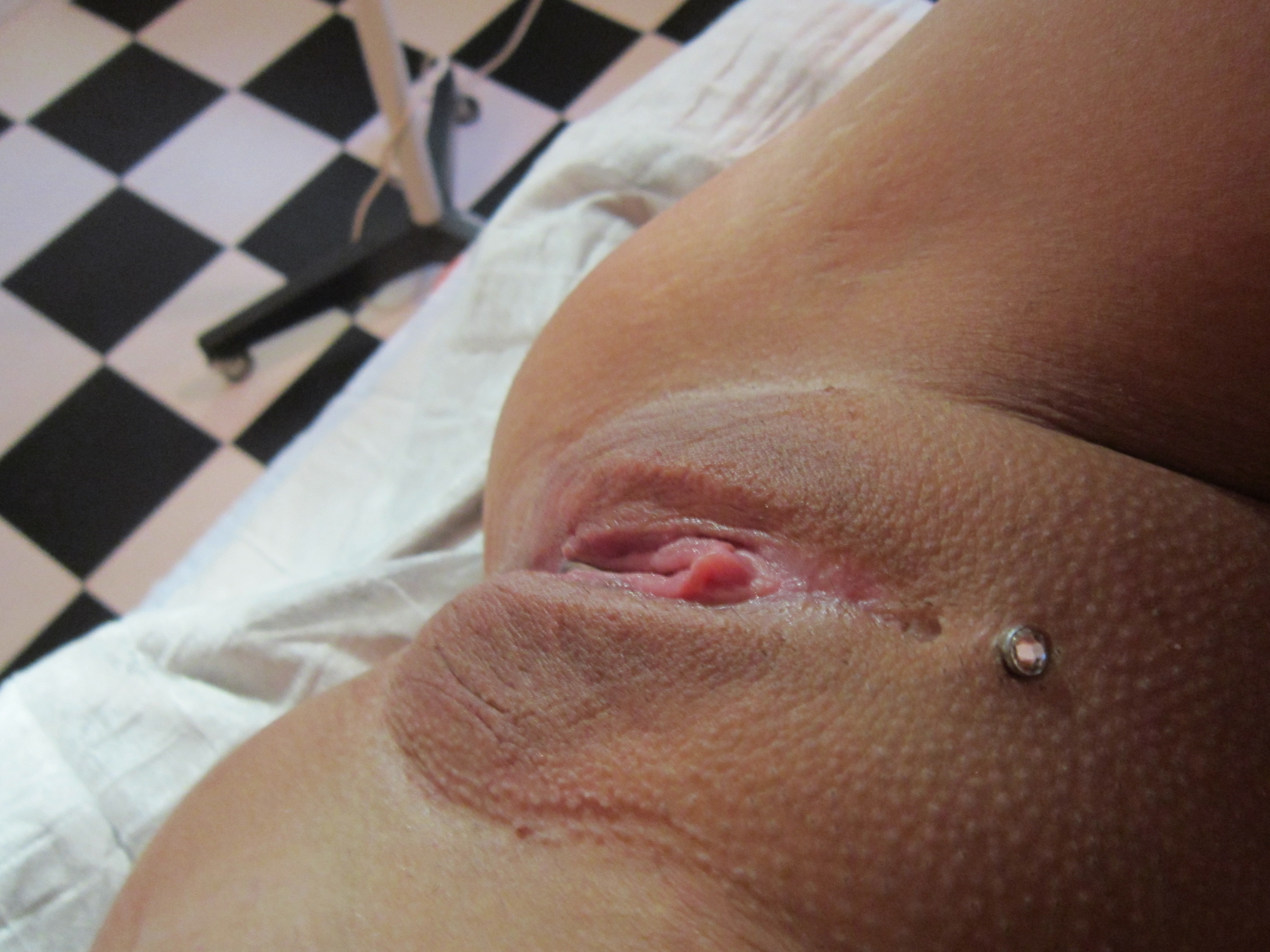
Result of clitoral unhooding

Studies have reported a high rate of patient satisfaction with the aesthetic changes to the vulvo-vaginal complex after labioplasty, and a low incidence rate of medical complications. The study Aesthetic Labia Minora and Clitoral Hood Reduction using Extended Central Wedge Resection (2008) reported that of a 407-woman cohort, 98 per cent were satisfied with the labial reduction outcomes; that the average patient satisfaction score was 9.2 points on a 10-point scale; that 95 per cent of the women experienced reduced pudendal discomfort; that 93 per cent of the women experienced improved self esteem; that 71 per cent experienced improved sexual functioning; that 0.6 per cent (one woman) reported lessened sexual functioning; and that 4.4 per cent of the women experienced medical complications. The study Expectations and Experience of Labial Reduction: A Qualitative Study (2007) reported that the women who underwent labiaplasty had great expectations for the elimination of pubic discomfort and pain, improved cosmetic appearance of the vulva, and improved sexual functioning. Most of the women experienced improved self esteem; yet the study also reported that formal psychological counselling before the surgical operation about what to expect and what not to expect from a labia minora and clitoral prepuce reduction procedure might better serve the prospective patient by assisting her in establishing realistic expectations for her genital beauty and mental health after such a procedure.

== Criticism ==
Partial or total hoodectomy is classified by the World Health Organization as female genital mutilation (FGM) Type 1A. However, this classification is criticised as being "overly-simplified" and "culturally insensitive" by some. They argue that hoodectomy is no different than male circumcision, which is legally permitted in most countries, and is often less invasive in practice.

The American College of Obstetricians and Gynecologists (ACOG) published Committee Opinion No. 378: Vaginal "Rejuvenation" and Cosmetic Vaginal Procedures (2007), the college's formal policy statement of opposition to the commercial misrepresentations of labiaplasty, and associated vaginoplastic procedures, as medically "accepted and routine surgical practices". The ACOG doubts the medical safety and the therapeutic efficacy of the surgical techniques and procedures for performing vaginoplastic operations such as labiaplasty, vaginal rejuvenation, the designer vagina, revirgination, and G-spot amplification, and recommends that women seeking such genitoplastic surgeries must be fully informed, with the available surgical-safety statistics, of the potential health risks of surgical-wound infection, of pudendal nerve damage (resulting in either an insensitive or an over-sensitive vulva), of dyspareunia (painful coitus), of tissue adhesions (epidermoid cysts), and of painful scars.

== Risks ==
The dorsal nerves of the clitoris travel above the clitoris along the clitoral body. Permanent injury to these nerves can occur with clitoral hood reductions.

== See also ==
- Circumcision
- Genital modification and mutilation
