= Vulvoplasty =

Operation to construct or reconstruct a vulva

Vulvoplasty, also known as zero-depth vaginoplasty, is a plastic surgery procedure for altering the appearance of one's vulva or constructing a vulva from penile and scrotal tissue (a neovulva).

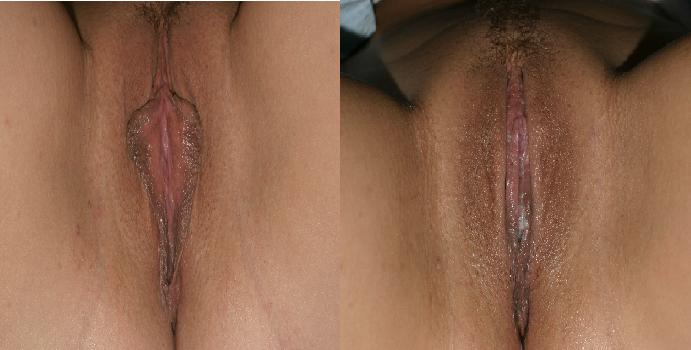
Labiaplasty, pre- and post-op. The labia minora has been reduced in size.

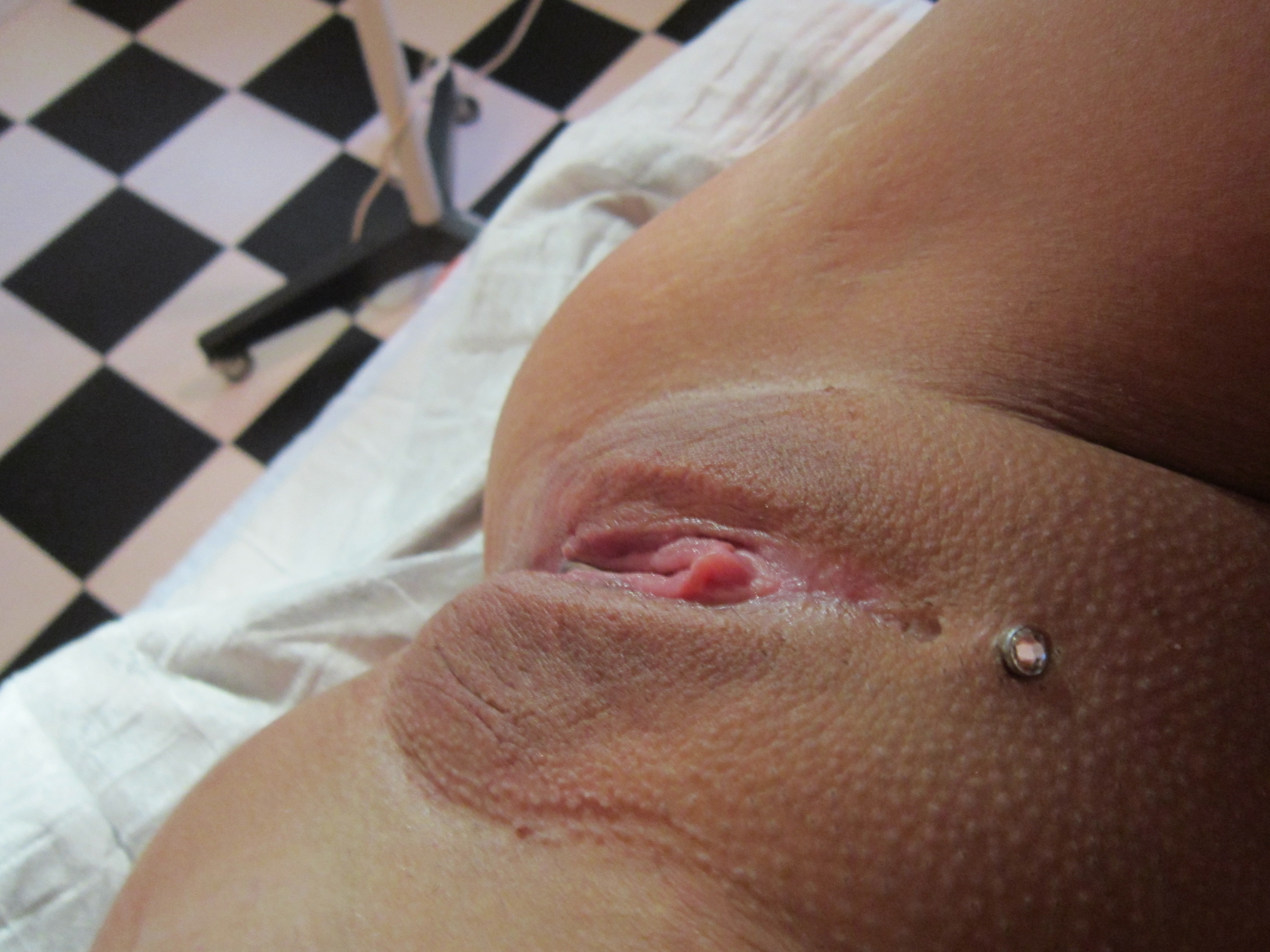
Vulva after clitoral hood reduction and labiaplasty

== Surgery ==
=== Reasons for vulvoplasty ===
Women with congenital disorders or women post-vulvectomy or with genital trauma may receive vulvoplasty for medical reasons.

Women who experience vulvar discomfort may also receive vulvoplasty.

=== Gender-affirming surgery ===
In gender-affirming surgery, some trans women patients receive vulvoplasty without vaginoplasty to reconstruct the exterior of female genitalia (Neovulva).

During clitoroplasty, a clitoris is made from the tissue of the glans penis.

Labiaplasty can be performed as a discrete surgery, or as a subordinate procedure within a vaginoplasty. The labia minora are typically constructed from genital skin and the labia majora using skin from the scrotum.

The urinary meatus in trans women is created by shortening the urethra and positioning it above the neovagina in such a way that the urine will descend downward while urinating in a seated position.
