= Clitoroplasty =

Plastic surgery involving the clitoris

Clitoroplasty is a type of plastic surgery involving the clitoris. It encompasses several procedures, including clitoral reduction, clitoral reconstruction, and the creation of a neoclitoris in male-to-female gender-affirming surgery. These surgeries aim to retain or restore sensation and function in the clitoris, often employing nerve-sparing techniques.

== Clitoral reconstruction ==
Clitoral reconstruction is surgery to restore the function and structure of the clitoris. Examples of clitoral reconstruction include its use to mitigate congenital malformation or repair damage caused by female genital mutilation.

Clitoral reconstruction after female genital mutilation involves surgery to expose the remaining deep structures of the clitoris. As of 2023, there was little evidence for the therapeutic effectiveness of this procedure. Charities that work in the field of clitoral reconstruction include The Marci Foundation led by Dr. Marci Bowers, Clitoraid, a project by a UFO religion, and the Desert Flower Foundation. The Marci Foundation and Desert Flower Foundation also do reconstruction work on patients who have been subjected to the more invasive type III FGM. Some surgeons offer services relating to reconstruction outside of charity settings as well.

== Clitoral reduction ==
Clitoral reduction is the surgical reduction in size of the clitoris, used to treat clitoromegaly. Unlike clitoridectomy, the amputation of part of the clitoris, commonly considered a form of female genital mutilation, modern clitoral reduction surgery aims to preserve sensation and function through the use of nerve-sparing microsurgical techniques.

It should be distinguished from clitoral hood reduction, an operation on the clitoral hood in which the clitoris itself is not damaged.

== Gender-affirming surgery ==
During male-to-female gender-affirming surgery, a neoclitoris is made from the tissue of the glans penis.

In female-to-male gender-affirming surgery, metoidioplasty is an operation in which the clitoris is repositioned to create a neophallus.

== See also ==
- Vulvoplasty
