= Stefan Gress =

German plastic and reconstructive surgeon

- Born: Germany
- Known for: Composite Reduction Labiaplasty
- Scientific career
- Fields: Plastic and Reconstructive surgeon

Stefan Gress is a German plastic and reconstructive surgeon. He is best known for his contributions to composite reduction labiaplasty and has published various notable works within the field of labiaplasty.

== Career ==
Gress studied plastic surgery with Ivo Pitanguy in Rio de Janeiro, where he also practiced plastic surgery. He also attended LMU Munich, Technical University of Munich, Universidade Federal da Bahia, and New York University School of Medicine where he specialized in aesthetic surgery particularly concerning breast, face, and female genital area.

Gress has published various works concerning composite reduction labiaplasty where he helped develop methodologies for treating areas concerning internal and external labium minus, dissection of the cranial pedicle flap, and the labia minora area.

== Publications ==
- Rundschau. Publication: Ästhetische und funktionelle Korrekturen im weiblichen Genitalbereich: 47: 23–32 (2007).
- Die Optimierung Der Genitalregion. Publication: Operationsmethoden, Komplikationen und Patientenzufriedenheit: Edition 2, Page 11 (2010)
- Ästhetische Chirurgie. Publication: Form- und funktionsverbessernde Eingriffe im weiblichen Genitalbereich (April 2011).
- Aesthetic Plastic Surgery. Publication: Composite Reduction Labiaplasty. Edition No. 4 (2013/37).
- Jahrestagung Der Deutschen Gesellschaft Fur Plastische Und Wiederherstellungschirurgie E.V. Düsseldorf (October 2015)
- Kongress: F.A.C.E 2 face. Cannes / France Presidency: Prof. Gress Labia Minoraplasty and Majoraplast (September 2016).
