= Gress (surname) =

Gress is a surname. Notable people with the surname include:

- David Gress (born 1953), Danish historian
- Drew Gress (born 1959), American jazz double-bassist and composer
- Elsa Gress (1919–1988), Danish writer and dramatist
- Gilbert Gress (born 1941), French footballer and manager
- Jesse Gress (1956–2023), American rock guitarist
- Stefan Gress, German plastic surgeon
