= Labiaplasty =

Plastic surgery procedure for altering the labia minora

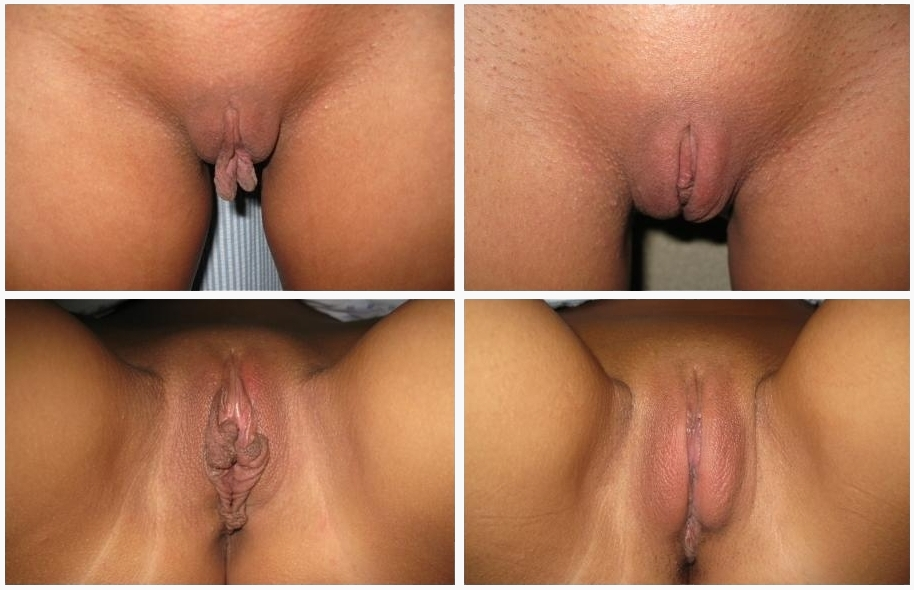
- Result of labiaplasty (top, left-before then right-after) in combination with clitoral hood reduction (bottom)

Labiaplasty (also known as labioplasty, labia minora reduction, and labial reduction) is a plastic surgery procedure for creating or altering the labia minora (inner labia) and the labia majora (outer labia), the folds of skin of the human vulva. It is a type of vulvoplasty. There are two main categories of women seeking cosmetic genital surgery: those with conditions such as intersex, and those with no underlying condition who experience physical discomfort or wish to alter the appearance of their vulvas because they believe they do not fall within a normal range.

The size, colour, and shape of labia vary significantly, and may change as a result of childbirth, aging, and other events. Conditions addressed by labiaplasty include congenital defects and abnormalities such as vaginal atresia (absent vaginal passage), Müllerian agenesis (malformed uterus and fallopian tubes), intersex conditions (male and female sexual characteristics in a person); and tearing and stretching of the labia minora caused by childbirth, accident, and age. In feminizing vaginoplasty for the creation of a neovagina, labiaplasty creates labia where once there were none.

A 2008 study reported that 32 percent of women who underwent the procedure did so to correct a functional impairment; 31 percent to correct a functional impairment and for aesthetic reasons; and 37 percent for aesthetic reasons alone. According to a 2011 review, overall patient satisfaction is in the 90–95 percent range. Risks include permanent scarring, infections, bleeding, irritation, and nerve damage leading to increased or decreased sensitivity. A change in requirements of publicly funded Australian plastic surgery requiring women to be told about natural variation in labias led to a 28% reduction in the number of surgeries performed. Unlike public hospitals, cosmetic surgeons in private practice are not required to follow these rules, and critics say that "unscrupulous" providers are charging to perform the procedure on women who would not want it if they had more information.

Images of vulvae are absent from the popular media and advertising and do not appear in some anatomy textbooks, while community opposition to sex education limits the access that young women have to information about natural variation in labias. Many women have limited knowledge of vulval anatomy, and are unable to say what a "normal" vulva looks like. At the same time, many pornographic images of women's genitals are digitally manipulated, changing the size and shape of the labia to fit with the censorship standards in different countries. Medical researchers have raised concerns about the procedure and its increasing prevalence rates, with some speculating that exposure to pornography images on the Internet may lead to body image dissatisfaction in some women. Although it is also suggested that evidence for this is lacking, the National Health Service stated that some women bring along advert or pornographic images to illustrate their desired genital appearance.

== Size of the labia ==
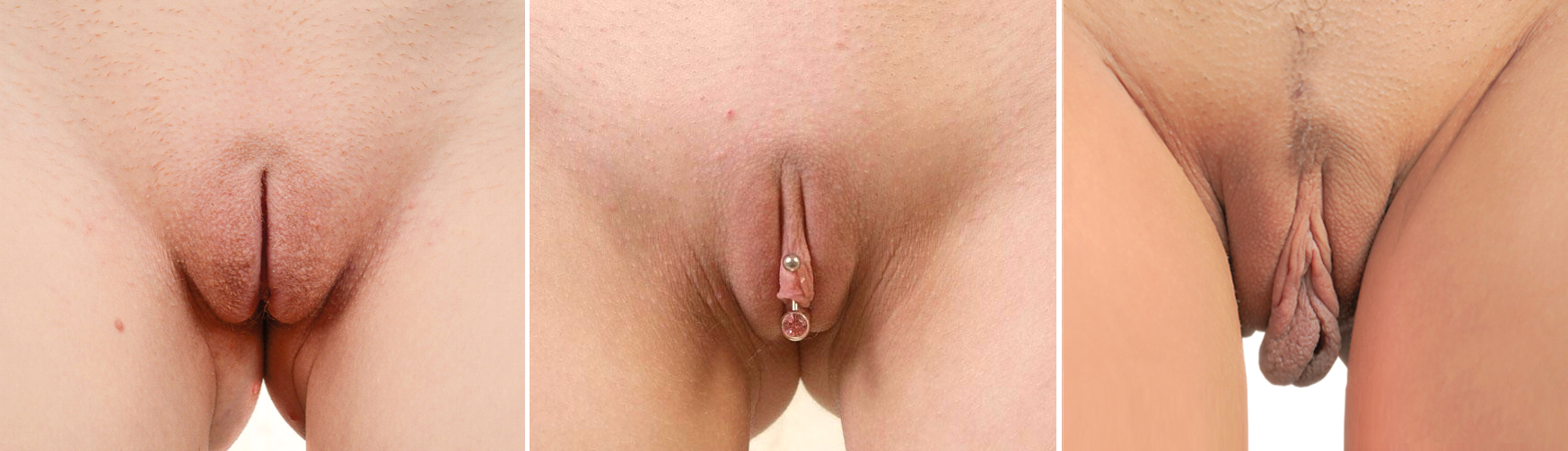
The individual size, coloration and shapes of the labia minora are subject to significant variability. In some individuals, the labia minora are completely covered by the labia majora in a standing posture, while in others they protrude visibly from the pubic cleft.

The external genitalia of a woman are collectively known as the vulva. This comprises the labia majora (outer labia), the labia minora (inner labia), the clitoris, the urinary meatus, and the vaginal opening. The labia majora extend from the mons pubis to the perineum.

The size, shape, and color of the inner labia vary greatly. One is usually larger than the other. They may be hidden by the outer labia, or may be visible, and may become larger with sexual arousal, sometimes two to three times their usual diameter.

The size of the labia can change because of childbirth. Genital piercings can increase labial size and asymmetry, because of the weight of the ornaments. In the course of treating identical twin sisters, S.P. Davison et al reported that the labia were the same size in each woman, which indicated genetic determination. In or around 2004, researchers from the Department of Gynaeology, Elizabeth Garret Anderson Hospital, London, measured the labia of 50 women between the ages of 18 and 50, with a mean age of 35.6:

	Measurements	Mean [standard deviation]
Clitoral length (mm)	5.0 – 35.0	19.1 [8.7]
Clitoral glans width (mm)	3.0 – 10.0	5.5 [1.7]
Clitoris to urethra (mm)	16.0 – 45.0	28.5 [7.1]
Labia majora length (cm)	7.0 – 12.0	9.3 [1.3]
Labia minora length (mm)	20 – 100	60.6 [17.2]
Labia minora width (mm)	7.0 – 50.0	21.8 [9.4]
Perineum length (mm)	15.0 – 55.0	31.3 [8.5]
Vaginal length (cm)	6.5 – 12.5	9.6 [1.5]
Tanner Stage (n)	IV	4.0 (8%)
Tanner Stage (n)	V	46 (92%)
Color of the genital area compared to the surrounding skin (n)	Same color	9 (18%)
Color of the genital area compared to the surrounding skin (n)	Darker color	41 (82%)
Rugosity of the labia (n)	Smooth (unwrinkled)	14 (28%)
Rugosity of the labia (n)	Moderately wrinkled	34 (68%)
Rugosity of the labia (n)	Markedly wrinkled	2 (4%)

== Surgery ==
=== Contraindications ===
Labia reduction surgery is relatively contraindicated for the woman who have active gynecological disease, such as an infection or a malignancy; the woman who is a tobacco smoker and is unwilling to quit, either temporarily or permanently, in order to optimize her wound-healing capability; and the woman who is unrealistic in her aesthetic goals. The latter should either be counselled or excluded from labioplastic surgery. Davison et al write that it should not be performed when the patient is menstruating to reduce potential hormonal effects and the increased risk of infection.

=== Feminizing surgery (transgender) ===
In the case of feminizing surgery surgery for transgender patients, labiaplasty is usually the second stage of a two-stage vaginoplasty/vulvoplasty operation, where labiaplasty techniques are applied to create labia minora and a clitoral hood. In this procedure, the labiaplasty is usually performed some months after the first stage of vaginoplasty.

=== Anaesthesia ===
Labial reduction can be performed under local anaesthesia, conscious sedation, or general anaesthesia, either as a discrete, single surgery, or in conjunction with another, gynecologic or cosmetic, surgery procedure. The resection proper is facilitated with the administration of an anaesthetic solution (lidocaine + epinephrine in saline solution) that is infiltrated to the labia minora to achieve the tumescence (swelling) of the tissues and the constriction of the pertinent labial circulatory system, the hemostasis that limits bleeding.

=== Procedures ===
==== Edge resection technique ====
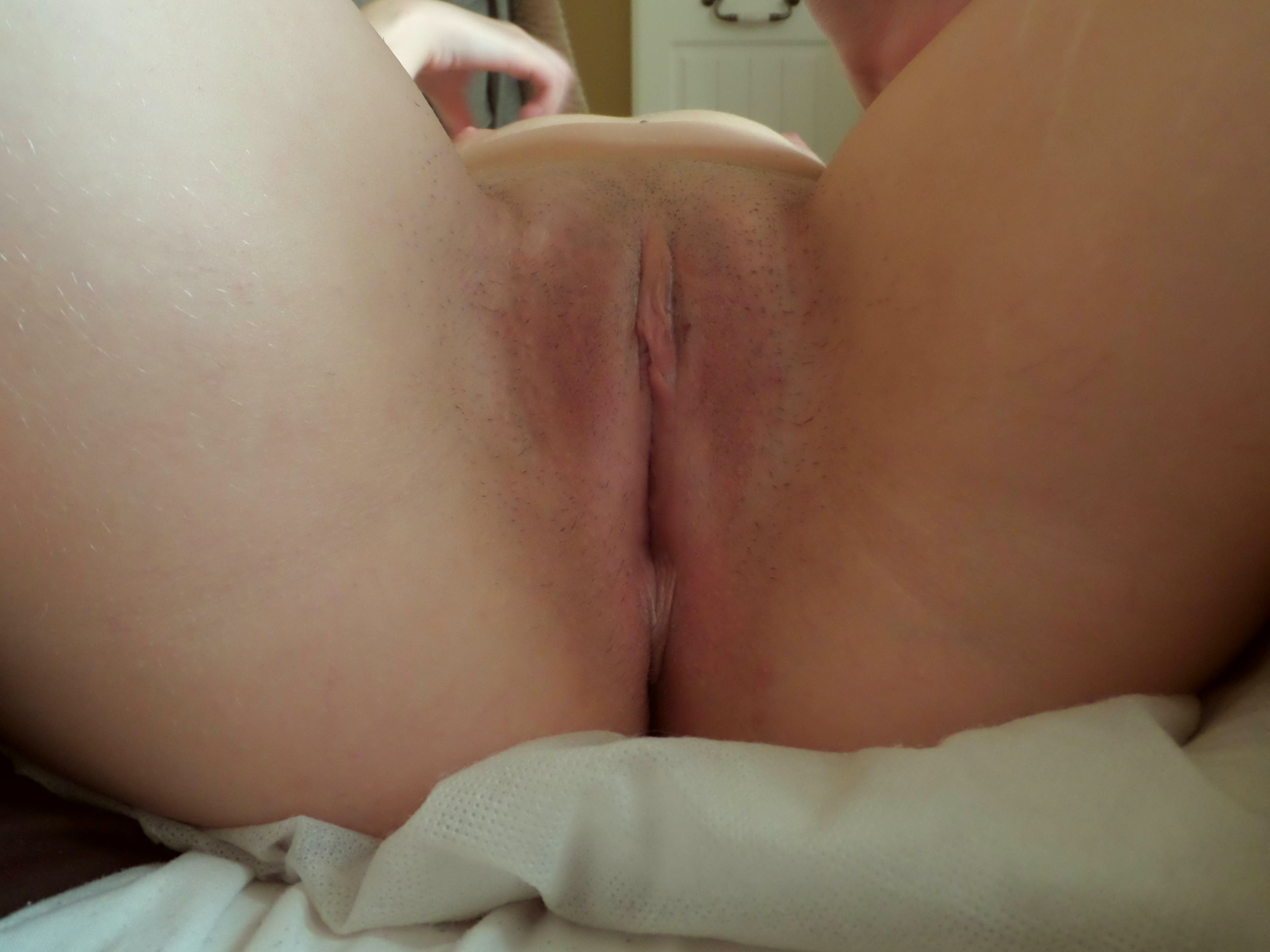
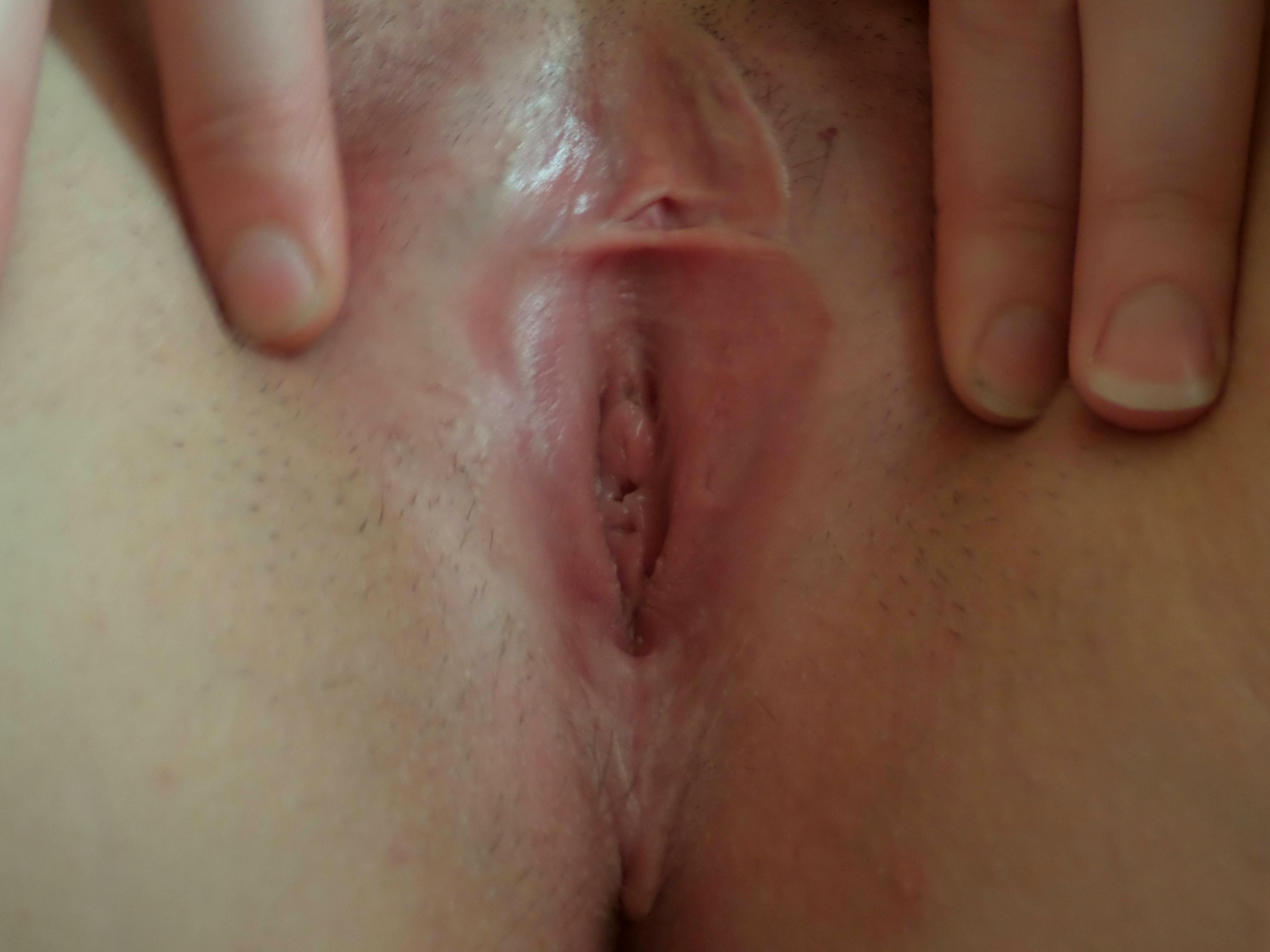
Full ablation of the inner labia by use of the trim- (edge resection-) technique, that results in no protuberance of labial tissue

The original labiaplasty technique was simple resection of tissues at the free edge of the labia minora. One resection-technique variation features a clamp placed across the area of labial tissue to be resected, in order to establish hemostatis (stopped blood-flow), and the surgeon resects the tissues, and then sutures the cut labium minus or labia minora. This procedure is used by most surgeons because it is easiest to perform. The technical disadvantages of the labial-edge resection technique are the loss of the natural rugosity (wrinkles) of the labia minora free edges, thus, aesthetically, it produces an unnatural appearance to the vulva, and also presents a greater risk of damaging the pertinent nerve endings. Moreover, there also exists the possibility of everting (turning outwards) the inner lining of the labia, which then makes visible the normally hidden internal, pink labial tissues. The advantages of edge-resection include removal of the hyper-pigmented (darkened) irregular labial edges with a linear scar. Another disadvantage of the trim or "amputation" method, is that it is unable to excise redundant tissues of the clitoral hood, when present. Complete amputation of the labia minora is more common with this technique, which often requires additional surgery to correct. In addition, the trim method does not address the clitoral hood. Clitoral hood deformities are common with this approach, again requiring additional corrective surgery. Some women complain of a "small penis" when the trim procedure is performed, owing to the un-addressed clitoral hood tissue and completely removed (amputated) labia minor. Most plastic surgeons do not perform this procedure, and instead favor the extended wedge approach, which is technically more demanding, but produces a more natural result and is able to create a natural and proportioned appearance to the vulva. Reconstructive procedures are often required after the trim (amputation) labiaplasty.

==== Central wedge resection technique ====
Labial reduction by means of a central wedge-resection involves cutting and removing a partial-thickness wedge of tissue from the thickest portion of the labium minus. Unlike the edge-resection technique, the resection pattern of the central wedge technique preserves the natural rugosity ("wrinkled" edge) of the labia minora. If performed as a full-thickness resection, there exists the potential risk of damaging the pertinent labial nerves, which can result in painful neuromas, and numbness. A partial thickness removal of mucosa and skin, leaving the submucosa intact, decreases the risk of this complication. F. Giraldo et al. procedurally refined the central wedge resection technique with an additional 90-degree Z-plasty technique, which produces a refined surgical scar that is less tethered, and diminishes the physical tensions exerted upon the surgical-incision wound, and, therefore, reduces the likelihood of a notched (scalloped-edge) scar. The central wedge-resection technique is a demanding surgical procedure, and difficulty can arise with judging the correct amount of labial skin to resect, which might result in either undercorrection (persistent tissue-redundancy), or the overcorrection (excessive tension to the surgical wound), and an increased probability of surgical-wound separation. The benefit of this technique is that an extended wedge can be brought upwards towards the prepuce to treat a prominent clitoral hood without a separate incision. This leads to a natural contour for the finished result, and avoids direct incisions near the highly-sensitive clitoris.

==== De-epithelialization technique ====
Labial reduction by means of the de-epithelialization of the tissues involves cutting the epithelium of a central area on the medial and lateral aspects of each labium minus (small lip), either with a scalpel or with a medical laser. This labiaplasty technique reduces the vertical excess tissue, whilst preserving the natural rugosity (corrugated free-edge) of the labia minora, and thus preserves the sensory and erectile characteristics of the labia. Yet, the technical disadvantage of de-epithelialization is that the width of the individual labium might increase if a large area of labial tissue must be de-epithelialized to achieve the labial reduction.

==== Labiaplasty with clitoral unhooding ====
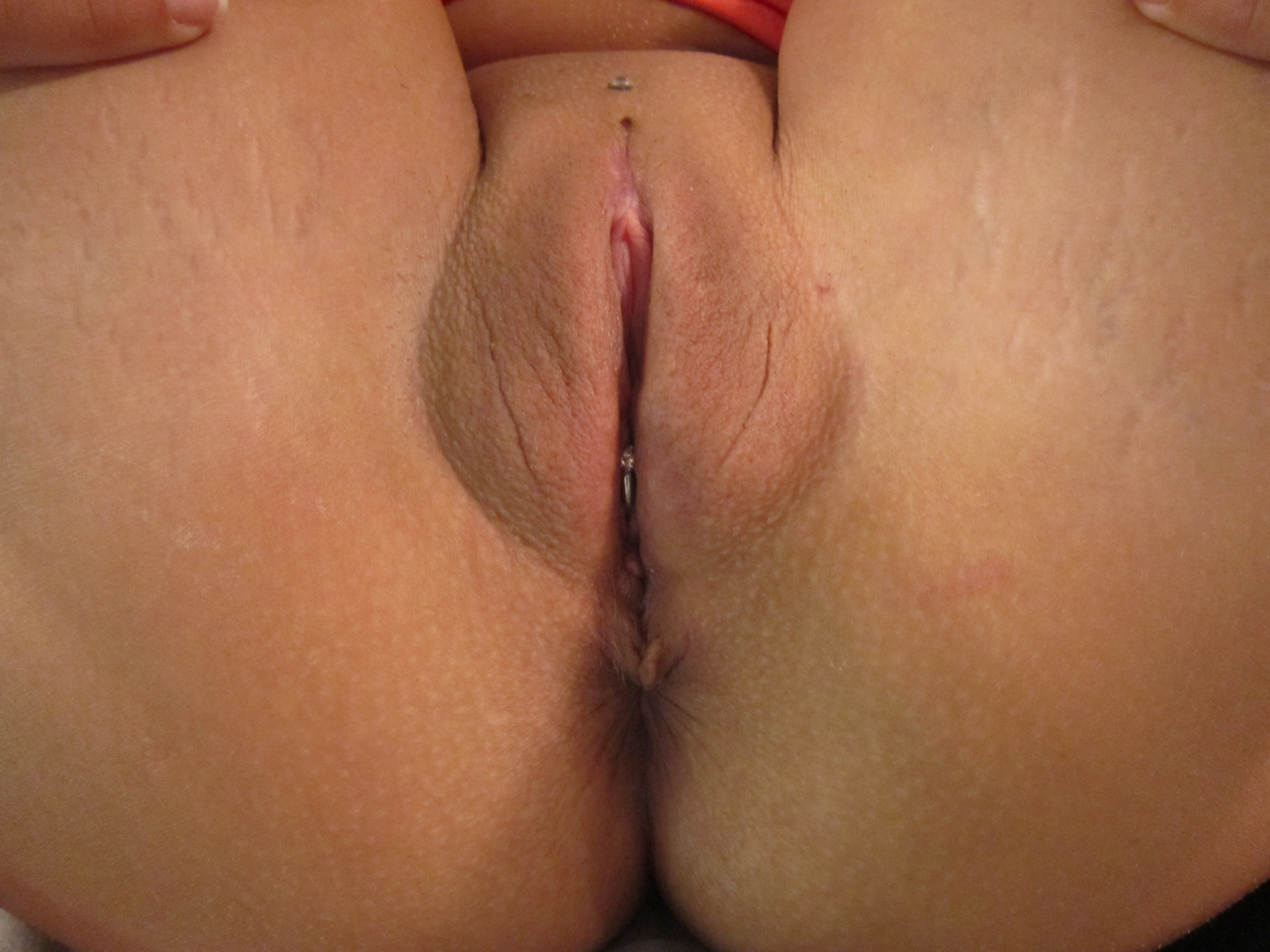
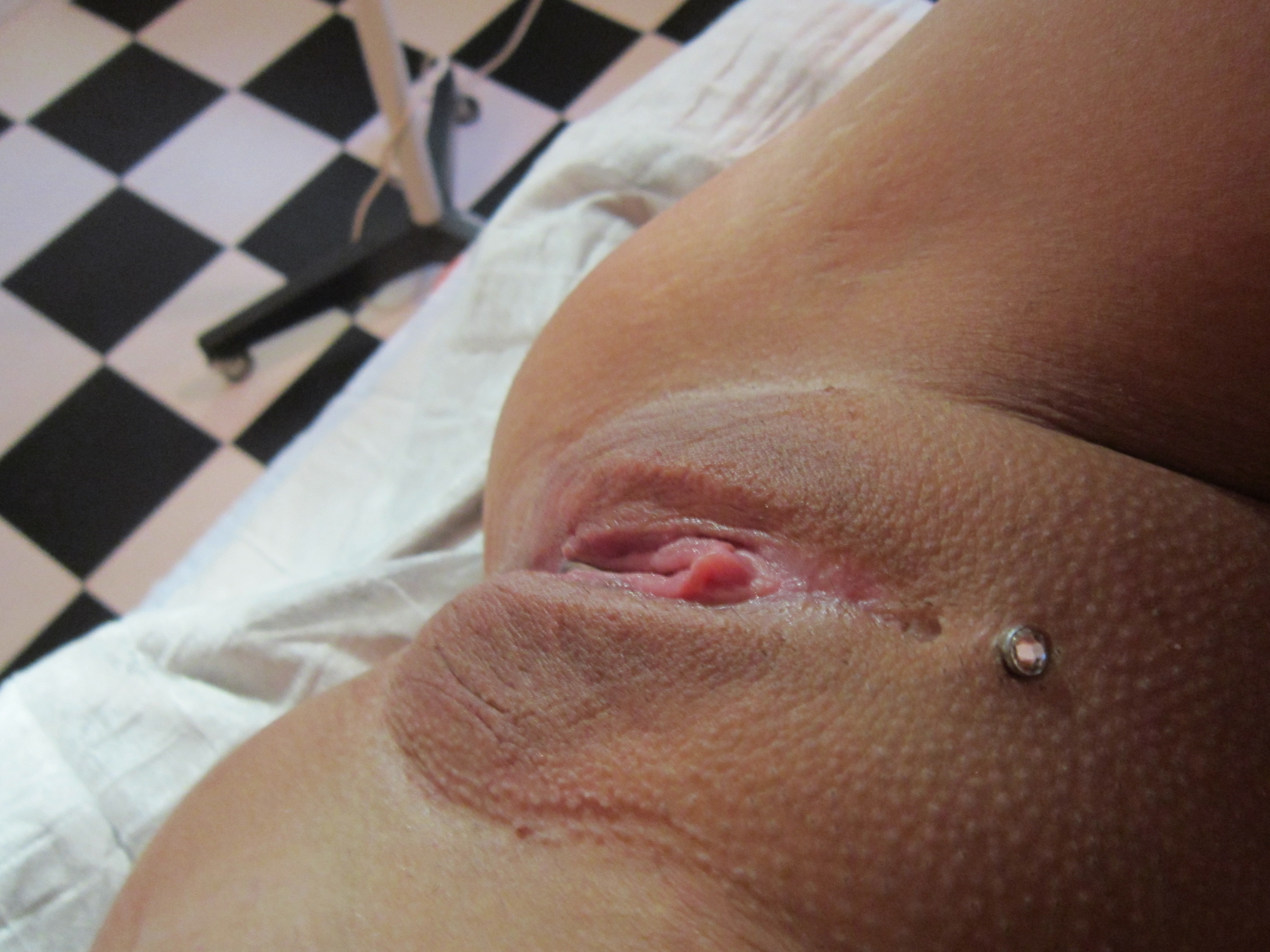
Labiaplasty with clitoral unhooding (with genital piercings)

Labial reduction occasionally includes the resection of the clitoral hood when the thickness of its skin interferes with the woman's sexual response or is aesthetically displeasing.

The surgical unhooding of the clitoris involves a V–to–Y advancement of the soft tissues, which is achieved by suturing the clitoral hood to the pubic bone in the midline (to avoid the pudendal nerves); thus, uncovering the clitoris further tightens the labia minora.

==== Laser labiaplasty technique ====
Labial reduction by means of laser resection of the labia minora involves the de-epithelialization of the labia. The technical disadvantage of laser labiaplasty is that the removal of excess labial epidermis risks causing the occurrence of epidermal inclusion cysts.

==== Labiaplasty by de-epithelialization ====
Labial reduction by de-epithelialization cuts and removes the unwanted tissue and preserves the natural rugosity (wrinkled free-edge) of the labia minora, and preserves the capabilities for tumescence and sensation. Yet, when the patient presents with much labial tissue, a combination procedure of de-epithelialization and clamp-resection is usually more effective for achieving the aesthetic outcome established by the patient and her surgeon. In the case of a woman with labial webbing (redundant folding) between the labia minora and the labia majora, the de-epithelialization labiaplasty includes an additional resection technique – such as the five-flap Z-plasty ("jumping man plasty") – to establish a regular and symmetric shape for the reduced labia minora.

=== Post-operative care ===
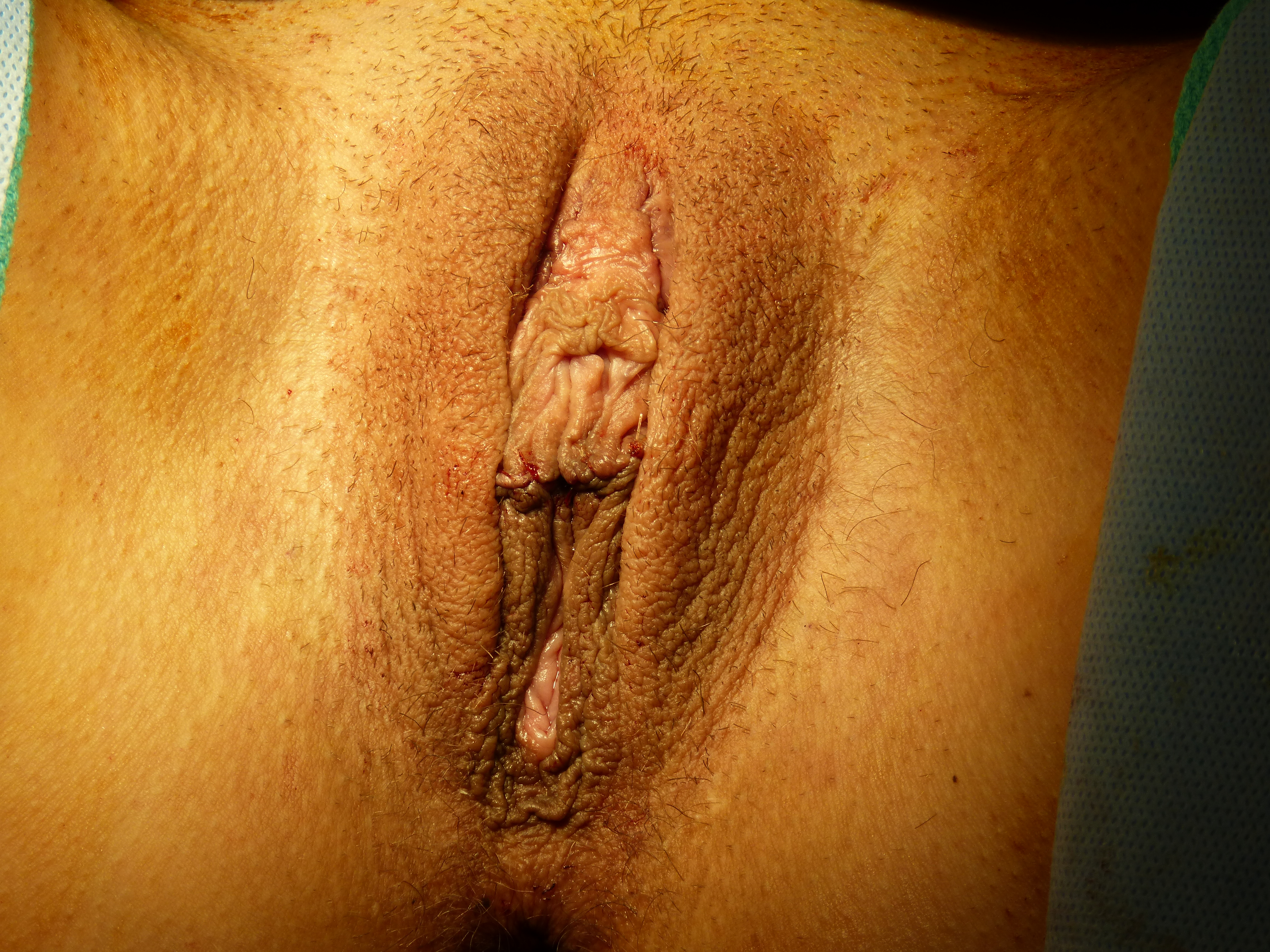
This photo demonstrates the appearance of the labia minora and clitoral hood just after surgery in the operative theater. Note that the inner labia are less prominent than before surgery.

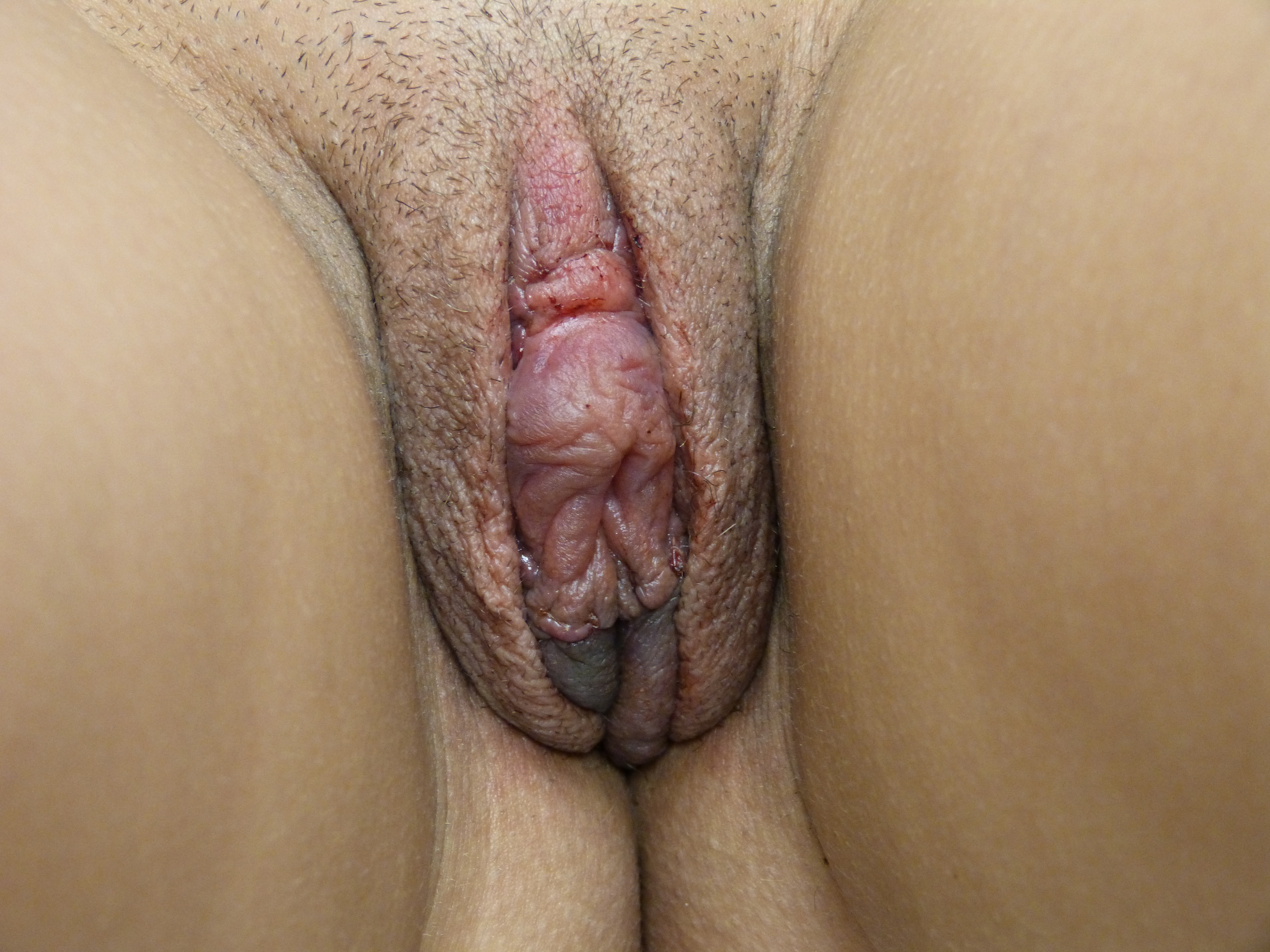
This photo was taken one week after an extended wedge labiaplasty with clitoral hood reduction. The inner and outer labia can be seen as edematous, with the most swelling noticed in the clitoral hood area.

Post-operative pain is minimal, and the woman is usually able to leave hospital the same day. No vaginal packing is required, although she might choose to wear a sanitary pad for comfort. The physician informs the woman that the reduced labia are often very swollen during the early post-operative period, because of the edema caused by the anaesthetic solution injected to swell the tissues.

She is also instructed on the proper cleansing of the surgical wound site, and the application of a topical antibiotic ointment to the reduced labia, a regimen observed two to three times daily for several days after surgery.

The woman's initial, post-labiaplasty follow up appointment with the surgeon is recommended within the week after surgery. She is advised to return to the surgeon's consultation room should she develop hematoma, an accumulation of blood outside the pertinent (venous and arterial) vascular system. Depending on her progress, the woman can resume physically unstrenuous work three to four days after surgery. To allow the wounds to heal, she is instructed not to use tampons, not to wear tight clothes (e.g. thong underwear), and to abstain from sexual intercourse for four weeks after surgery.

Medical complications to a labiaplasty procedure are uncommon, yet occasional complications – bleeding, infection, labial asymmetry, poor wound-healing, undercorrection, overcorrection – do occur, and might require a revision surgery. An over-aggressive resection might damage the nerves, causing painful neuromas. Performing a flap-technique labiaplasty occasionally presents a greater risk for necrosis of the labia minora tissues.

== Criticism ==
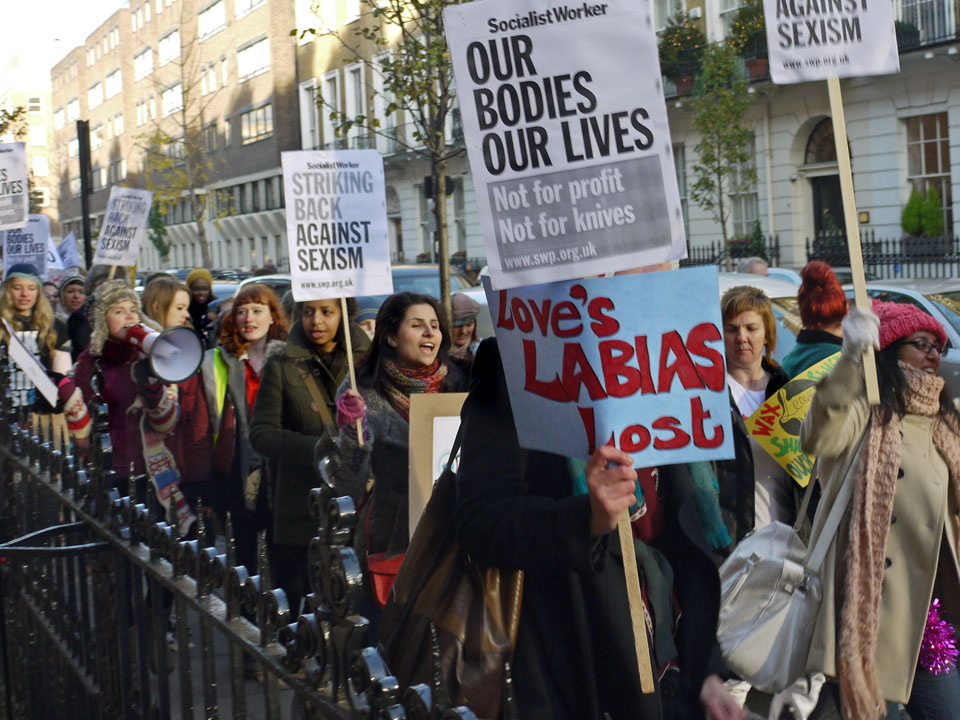
Protest march in London opposing cosmetic labiaplasty surgery

Labiaplasty is a controversial subject. Critics argue that a woman's decision to undergo the procedure stems from an unhealthy self-image induced by their comparison of themselves to the prepubescent-like images of women they see in commercials or pornography.

In Australia, the Royal Australian College of General Practitioners has issued guidelines on referring patients with dissatisfaction with their genitals to specialists. A change in requirements of publicly funded Australian plastic surgery requiring women to be told about natural variation in labias led to a 28% reduction in the numbers of surgeries performed. Unlike public hospitals, cosmetic surgeons in private practise are not required to follow these rules, and critics say that "unscrupulous" providers are charging to perform the procedure on women who would not undergo it if they had more information.

Increasing numbers of women in Western countries are also using Brazilian waxing to remove pubic hair, and choosing to wear tight-fitting swimwear and clothing. This has led to increased numbers of women complaining of pain and discomfort from chafing of the labia minora, as well as cosmetic concerns around how the appearance of genitals. In many countries, media regulation classifies "hardcore" and "softcore" pornography – demanding that magazines with "hardcore" pornography be wrapped in black plastic and sold only to people over 18 who show photo ID. Sales of magazines in black plastic tend to be low, and thus many magazine publishers choose to comply with the "softcore" standards. In Australian magazines, images of vulvas that do not look like "a single crease" are digitally modified to comply with the censorship standard. An Australian pornographic actress says that images of her own genitals sold to pornographic magazines in different countries are digitally manipulated to change the size and shape of the labia according to censorship standards in different countries. Community opposition to sex education limits the access that young women have to information about natural variation in labias.

Linda Cardozo, a gynaecologist at King's College Hospital, London, told the newspaper that women were placing themselves at risk in an industry that is largely unregulated. Nina Hartley says that "she's seen every type of vulva in her three decades working in the industry. When young women start out in porn, producers don't send them off for a routine labiaplasty."

Although female genital mutilation – the practice of cutting off a woman's labia and sometimes clitoris, and in some cases creating a seal across her entire vulva – is illegal across the Western world, Simone Davis, a professor and gender theorist at Mount Holyoke College in Massachusetts, argues that "when you really look carefully at the language used in some of those laws, they would also make illegal the labiaplasties that are being done by plastic surgeons in the U.S." The World Health Organization (WHO) defines female genital mutilation as "all procedures that involve partial or total removal of the external female genitalia, or other injury to the female genital organs for non-medical reasons." The WHO writes that the term is not generally applied to elective procedures such as labiaplasty.

The American College of Obstetricians and Gynecologists (ACOG) published an opinion in the September 2007 issue of Obstetrics & Gynecology that several "vaginal rejuvenation" procedures were not medically indicated, and that there was no documentation of their safety and effectiveness. ACOG argued that it was deceptive to give the impression that the procedures were accepted and routine surgical practices. It recommended that women seeking such surgeries must be given the available surgical-safety statistics, and warned of the potential risks of infection, altered sensation caused by damaged nerves, dyspareunia (painful sexual intercourse), tissue adhesions, and painful scarring.

In the UK, Lih Mei Liao and Sarah M. Creighton of the University College London Institute for Women's Health wrote in the British Medical Journal in 2007 that "the few reports that exist on patients' satisfaction with labial reductions are generally positive, but assessments are short-term and lack methodological rigour." They wrote that the increased demand for cosmetic genitoplasty (labiaplasty) may reflect a "narrow social definition of normal." The National Health Service performed double the number of genitoplasty procedures in the year 2006 than in the 2001–2005 period. The authors noted that "the patients consistently wanted their vulvas to be flat, with no protrusion beyond the labia majora ... some women brought along images to illustrate the desired appearance, usually from adverts or pornography that may have been digitally altered." The Royal Australian and New Zealand College of Obstetricians and Gynæcologists published the same concern about the exploitation of psychologically insecure women.

The International Society for the Study of Women's Sexual Medicine produced a report in 2007 concluding that "vulvar plastic surgery may be warranted only after counseling if it is still the patient's preference, provided that it is conducted in a safe manner and not solely for the purpose of performing surgery".

== See also ==
- Anal bleaching
- Elongated labia
- Femalia
- Labia stretching
- Vaginoplasty
