= Clitoridectomy =

Surgical removal of the clitoris

- Other names: Clitorectomy
- Specialty: Gynecology

Clitoridectomy or clitorectomy is the surgical removal, reduction, or partial removal of the clitoris. It is rarely used as a therapeutic medical procedure, such as when cancer has developed in or spread to the clitoris. Commonly, non-medical removal of the clitoris is performed during female genital mutilation.

== Medical uses ==
=== Malignancies ===
A clitoridectomy is often done to remove malignancy or necrosis of the clitoris. This is sometimes done along with a radical complete vulvectomy. Surgery may also become necessary due to therapeutic radiation treatments to the pelvic area.

Removal of the clitoris may be due to malignancy or trauma.

=== Clitoromegaly and other conditions ===
Female infants born with a 46,XX genotype but have a clitoris size affected by congenital adrenal hyperplasia and are treated surgically with vaginoplasty that often reduces the size of the clitoris without its total removal. The atypical size of the clitoris is due to an endocrine imbalance in utero. Other reasons for the surgery include issues involving microphallism and those who have Müllerian agenesis. Treatments on children raise human rights concerns.

== Technique ==
Clitoridectomy surgical techniques are used to remove an invasive malignancy that extends to the clitoris. Standard surgical procedures are followed in these cases. This includes evaluation and biopsy. Other factors that will affect the technique selected are age, other existing medical conditions, and obesity. Other considerations are the probability of extended hospital care and the development of infection at the surgical site.

The surgery proceeds with the use of general anesthesia, and prior to the vulvectomy/clitoridectomy an inguinal lymphadenectomy is first done. The extent of the surgical site extends 1 to 2 cm (0.39 to 0.79 in) beyond the boundaries of malignancy. Superficial lymph nodes may also need to be removed. If the malignancy is present in any muscles in the region, then the affected muscle tissue is also removed. In some cases, the surgeon is able to preserve the clitoris despite extensive malignancy. The cancerous tissue is removed and the incision is closed.

Post-operative care may employ the use of suction drainage to allow the deeper tissues to heal toward the surface. Follow-up after surgery includes the stripping of the drainage device to prevent blockage. A typical hospital stay can last up to two weeks. The site of the surgery is left unbandaged to allow for frequent examination.

Complications can include the development of lymphedema; not removing the saphenous vein during the surgery can help prevent this. In some instances, the buildup of fluid can be reduced through methods such as foot elevation, diuretic medication, and wearing compression stockings.

In a clitoridectomy for infants with a clitoromegaly, the clitoris is often reduced instead of removed. The surgeon cuts the shaft of the elongated phallus and sews the glans and preserved nerves back onto the stump. In a less common surgery called clitoral recession, the surgeon hides the clitoral shaft under a fold of skin so only the glans remains visible.

== Society and culture ==
=== General ===
While much feminist scholarship has described clitoridectomy as a practice aimed at controlling women's sexuality, the historic emergence of the practice in ancient European and Middle Eastern cultures may also have derived from ideas about what a normal female genitalia should look like and the policing of boundaries between the sexes.

In the seventeenth century, anatomists remained divided on whether a clitoris was a normal female organ, with some arguing that it was an abnormality in female development and, if large enough to be visible, it should always be removed at birth. In the 19th century, a clitoridectomy was thought by some to curb female masturbation; until the late 19th century, masturbation was thought by many to be unhealthy or immoral. Isaac Baker Brown (1812–1873), an English gynaecologist who was president of the Medical Society of London believed that the "unnatural irritation" of the clitoris caused epilepsy, hysteria, and mania, and he worked "to remove [it] whenever he had the opportunity of doing so", according to his obituary in the Medical Times and Gazette. Peter Lewis Allen writes that Brown's views caused outrage, and he died penniless after being expelled from the Obstetrical Society.

Occasionally, in American and English medicine of the nineteenth century, circumcision was done as a cure for insanity. Some believed that mental and emotional disorders were related to female reproductive organs and that removing the clitoris would cure the neurosis. This treatment was discontinued in 1867.

Aesthetics may determine clitoral norms. A lack of ambiguity of the genitalia is seen as necessary in the assignment of a sex to infants and therefore whether a child's genitalia is normal, but what is considered ambiguous or normal can vary from person to person. Early 19th-century medical physician Narciso Esparragosa was asked by the Guatemalan Royal Protomedicato to investigate the suspected hermaphroditism of Juana Aguilar. Aguilar had an enlarged clitoris and underwent multiple experiments by Esparragosa. Esparragosa compared Aguilar's clitoris to those of women from the Middle East whose sexuality was a threat to be tamed.

Sexual behavior is another reason for clitoridectomies. Author Sarah Rodriguez stated that the history of medical textbooks has indirectly created accepted ideas about the female body. Medical and gynecological textbooks are also at fault in the way that the clitoris is described in comparison to a male's penis. The importance and originality of a female's clitoris is underscored because it is seen as "a less significant organ, since anatomy texts compared the penis and the clitoris in only one direction." Rodriguez said that a male's penis created the framework of the sexual organ.

Not all historical examples of clitoral surgeries should be assumed to be clitoridectomy (removal of the clitoris). In the nineteen thirties, the French psychoanalyst Marie Bonaparte studied African clitoral surgical practices and showed that these often involved removal of the clitoral hood, not the clitoris. She also had a surgery done to her own clitoris by the Viennese surgeon Dr Halban, which entailed cutting the suspensory ligament of the clitoris to permit it to sit closer to her vaginal opening. These sorts of clitoral surgeries, contrary to reducing women's sexual pleasure, actually appear aimed at making coitus more pleasurable for women, though it is unclear if that is ever their actual outcome.

=== Human rights concerns ===
Clitoridectomies are the most common form of female genital mutilation. The World Health Organization (WHO) estimates that some form of FGM has been performed on 200 million girls and women that are currently alive. The regions that most clitoridectomies take place are Asia, the Middle East and west, north and east Africa. The practice also exists in migrants originating from these regions. Most of the surgeries are for cultural or religious reasons.

Clitoridectomy of people with conditions such as congenital adrenal hyperplasia that cause a clitoromegaly is controversial when it takes place during childhood or under duress. Many women who were exposed to such treatment have reported loss of physical sensation in the affected area, and loss of autonomy. In recent years, multiple human rights institutions have criticized early surgical management of such characteristics.

In 2013, it was disclosed in a medical journal that four unnamed elite female athletes from developing countries were subjected to gonadectomies and partial clitoridectomies after testosterone testing revealed that they had an intersex variation or disorder of sex development. In April 2016, the United Nations Special Rapporteur on health, Dainius Pūras, condemned this treatment as a form of genital mutilation "in the absence of symptoms or health issues warranting those procedures."

== See also ==
- Clitoroplasty subsection Clitoral reconstruction
- List of surgeries by type
- Genital mutilation
- Vaginoplasty
- Clitoromegaly
- Female genital mutilation
- Circumcision
