= Vaginoplasty =

Surgical procedure

- ICD-9-CM: 70.64, 70.62, 70.64, 70.94, 70.6, 70.95
- MeSH: D013509

Vaginoplasty is any surgical procedure that results in the construction or reconstruction of the vagina. It is a type of genitoplasty. Pelvic organ prolapse is often treated with one or more surgeries to repair the vagina. Sometimes a vaginoplasty is needed following the treatment or removal of malignant growths or abscesses to restore a normal vaginal structure and function. Surgery to the vagina is done to correct congenital defects to the vagina, urethra, and rectum. It may correct protrusion of the urinary bladder into the vagina (cystocele) and protrusion of the rectum (rectocele) into the vagina. Often, a vaginoplasty is performed to repair the vagina and its attached structures due to trauma or injury.

Congenital disorders such as adrenal hyperplasia can affect the structure and function of the vagina and sometimes the vagina is absent; these can be reconstructed or formed, using a vaginoplasty. Other candidates for the surgery include babies born with a microphallus, people with Müllerian agenesis resulting in vaginal hypoplasia, trans women, and women who have had a vaginectomy after malignancy or trauma.

== Medical uses ==
Vaginoplasty is the description of the following surgical interventions:

- separation of congenitally fused urethra and vagina
- repair of a urethra that is short
- vaginal construction
- vaginal reconstruction
- vaginal vault prolapse
- vaginal suspension and fixation
- operations on recto-uterine pouch
- repair of cystoceleand rectocele
- retropubic paravaginal repair
- the repair of a cystocele using a graft or prosthesis
- the repair of a cystocele and a rectocele in the same procedure using a graft or prosthetic device
- the repair of a rectocele using a graft or prosthetic material
- the vaginal construction using a graft or prosthetic material
- the vaginal reconstruction using a graft or prosthetic material
- the vaginal suspension and stabilization using with graft or prosthetic material
- treatment of MRKH syndrome (vaginal agenesis)
- hymenorrhaphy

In some instances, extra tissue is needed to reconstruct or construct the vagina. These grafts used in vaginoplasty can be an allotransplantation, a heterograft, or an autologous material. A woman can use an autologous in vitro cultured tissue taken from her vaginal vestibule as transplanted tissue to form the lining of the reconstructed vagina. A reconstructed or newly constructed vagina is called a neovagina.

=== Vaginoplasties in children ===
Conditions such as congenital adrenal hyperplasia virilize genetic females due to a 21-hydroxylase deficiency. Specific procedures include: clitoral reduction, labiaplasty, normalizing appearance, vagina creation, initiating vaginal dilation. Vaginal atresia, or congenital absence of the vagina, can be another reason for surgery to construct a normal and functional vagina. Vaginoplasty is used as part of the series of surgeries needed to treat those girls and women born with the bladder located outside of their abdomen. After the repairs, women have been able to give birth but are at risk of prolapse.

There are human rights concerns about vaginoplasties and other genital surgeries in children who are not old enough to consent, including concern with post-surgical sexual function, and assumptions of cisnormativity. There is no consensus attitude among clinicians about their necessity, timing, method or evaluation. Vaginoplasties may be performed in children or adolescents with intersex conditions or disorders of sex development.

== Techniques ==
Non-surgical vagina creation was used in the past to treat the congenital absence of a vagina. The procedure involved the wearing of a saddle-like device and the use of increasing-diameter vaginal dilators. The procedure took several months and was sometimes painful. It was not effective in every instance. Uncommon growths, cysts, septums in the vagina can also require vaginoplasty.

=== Reconstructive surgery after cancer treatment ===
Radiological cancer treatment can result in the destruction or alteration of vaginal tissues. Vaginoplasty is often performed to reconstruct the vagina and other genital structures. In some cases, normal sexual function can be restored.

=== Reconstructive surgery after female genital mutilation ===
There is a type of clitoroplasty called clitoral reconstruction that may be sought out by patients who were forced to undergo clitoris-removing FGM (such as Type IB) or experienced clitoridectomy for other reasons. Research results on the overall effectiveness of this procedure are mixed but patients claiming success are sometimes strong advocates. There are separate procedures to help restore healthier, more normal genital function for patients forced to undergo the more invasive type III FGM as well.

=== McIndoe surgical technique ===
A canal is surgically constructed between the urinary bladder and urethra in the anterior portion of the pelvic region and the rectum. A skin graft is used from another area of the person's body. The graft is removed from the thigh, buttocks, or inguinal region. Other materials have been used to create the lining of the new vagina. These have been cutaneous skin flaps, amniotic membranes, and buccal mucosa.

=== Gender-affirming surgery ===
Several techniques may be used in gender-affirming surgery to create a neovaginal canal or neovagina in short.

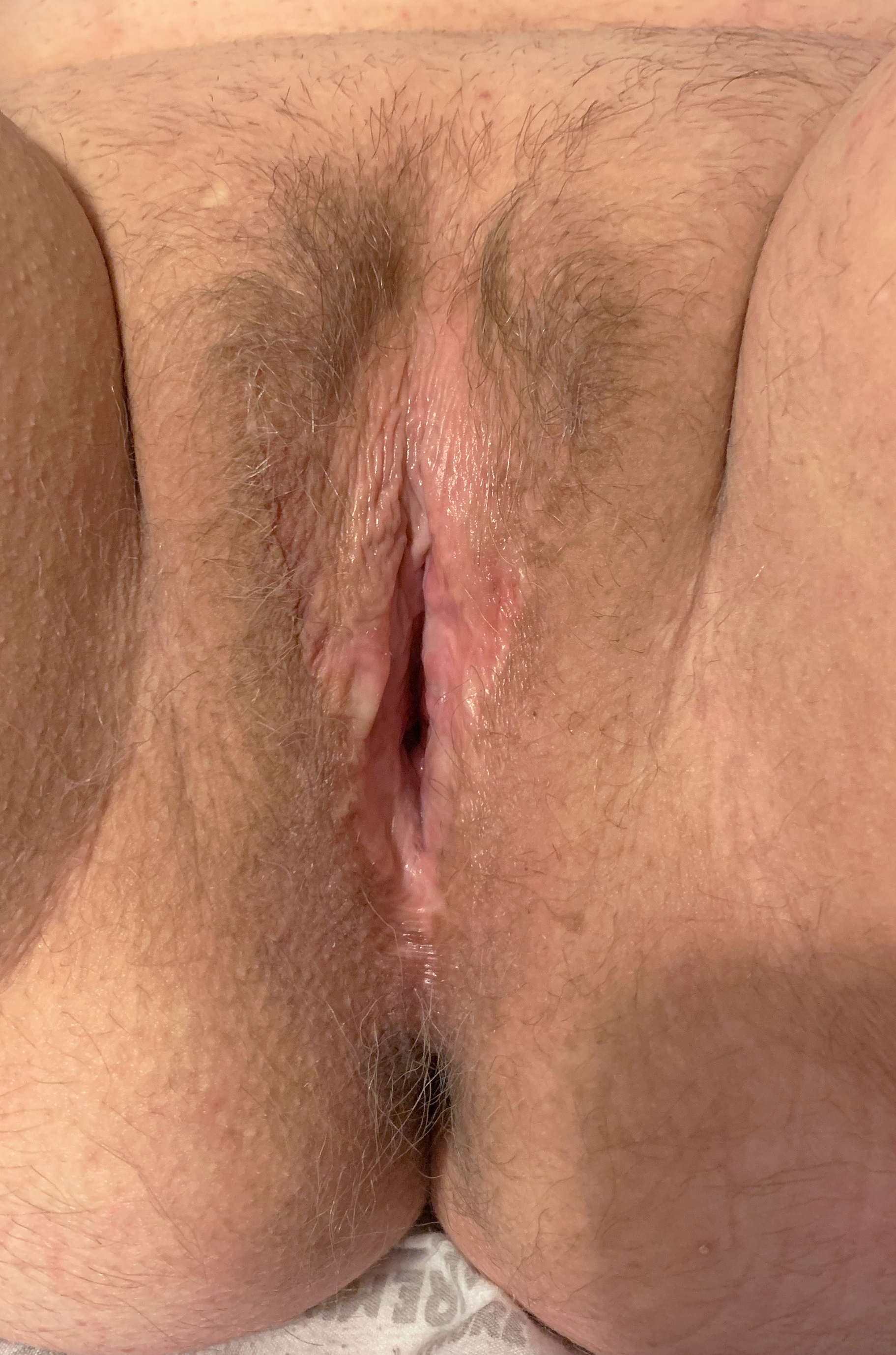
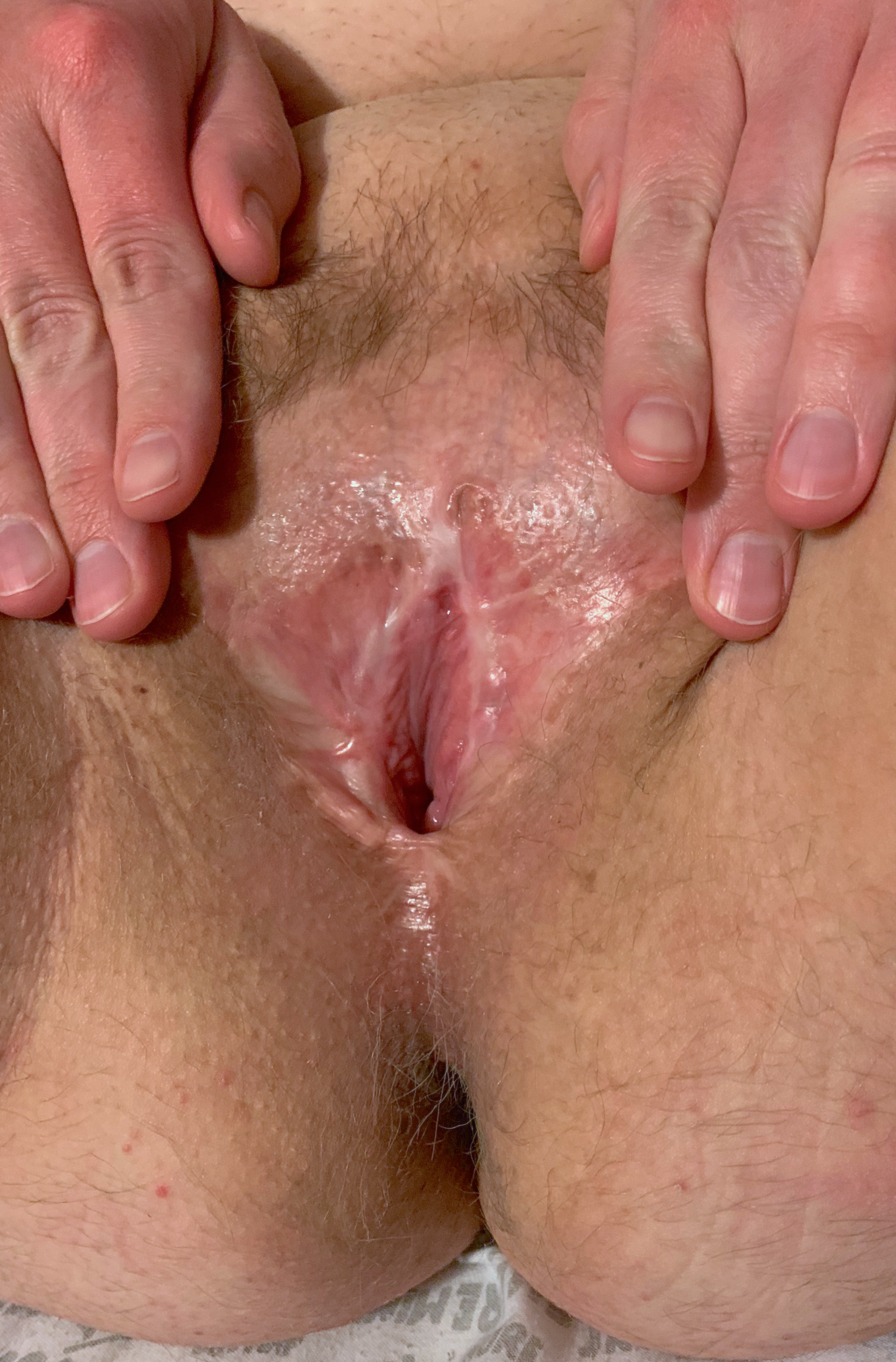
The results of a penile inversion vaginoplasty, two years after surgery. Inner labia vary aesthetically based on surgeon; here, they are very minimal. The clitoris is tactile rather than visual, another aesthetic difference by surgeon. A faded surgical scar comes up from the perineum and follows the outer labia in a curved Y.

==== Penile inversion ====
Inversion of the penile skin is the method most often selected to create a neovagina by surgeons performing gender-affirming surgery. The inverted penile skin uses inferior pedicle skin or abdominal skin for the lining of the neovagina. The skin is cut to form an appropriate-sized flap. The skin flap is sometimes combined with a scrotal or urethral flap.

The penile inversion technique was pioneered by Georges Burou in his Morocco clinic in the 1950s. By the 1970s he had performed hundreds of them, and gave his first public presentation of his technique to a conference at Stanford University in 1973, after which it gradually became the predominant technique worldwide.

==== Bowel vaginoplasty ====
Bowel vaginoplasty is another common vaginoplasty technique. It is also used for vaginoplasty in cisgender women. As with penile inversion vaginoplasty, the testicles and scrotum are removed, the glans made into a clitoris, and the neovulva constructed from scrotal, penile and urethral tissue. However, in bowel vaginoplasty a segment of rectosigmoid colon is grafted into a surgically created canal to form the neovagina.

As bowel vaginoplasty uses colon to construct the neovagina, post-operative depth is not dependent on the length of the penis prior to surgery. This makes it appropriate for individuals who have already undergone penectomy, orchiectomy, or who had a penis smaller than the desired depth of the neovagina prior to surgery. Unlike penile inversion vaginoplasty, the neovagina created through bowel vaginoplasty is self-lubricating and does not require further dilation once fully healed. A 2023 review, however, has found no difference between self-lubrication across different techniques in response to arousal.

==== Peritoneal vaginoplasty ====
Transgender peritoneal vaginoplasty, a.k.a. peritoneal pull-down or pull-through (PPT), is based on neovaginal techniques documented in the 1970s and 80s for cisgender women born without a vaginal canal due to agenesis/atresia, which were referred to as the "Davydov" procedure or "Rothman's" method. A 2022 review states, "In the last 5 years, peritoneal flap vaginoplasty has emerged as a promising technique".

This form of vaginoplasty utilizes tissue of the peritoneum to form the canal lining of the neovagina.

For trans women who had their puberty blocked, insufficient penile and scrotal skin may be available for traditional penile inversion. In such cases, peritoneal vaginoplasty remedies the issue of insufficient tissue. Peritoneal vaginoplasty can be used as a surgical revision to increase or restore vaginal depth in persons who have had a previous vaginoplasty.

This technique has been reported to provide some degree of vaginal lubrication. This lubrication, however, is not responsive to sexual arousal, and functions more as regular vaginal discharge while not identical to natal vaginal fluids.

==== Other methods ====
Penile-scrotal skin flaps are also used. Nongenital full-thickness graft (FTG) or split-thickness skin grafts from other parts of the body have been used.

=== Elective vaginoplasty ===
Critics have labeled such surgery as the "designer vagina". The American College of Obstetricians and Gynecologists issued a warning against these procedures in 2007 as did the Royal Australian and New Zealand College of Obstetricians and Gynaecologists, and a commentary in the British Medical Journal strongly criticized the "designer vagina" in 2009. The Society of Obstetricians and Gynaecologists of Canada published a policy statement against elective vaginoplasty based upon the risks associated with unnecessary cosmetic surgery in 2013.

Vaginal rejuvenation is a form of elective plastic surgery. Its purpose is to restore or enhance the vagina's cosmetic appearance.

=== Hymen surgical procedures ===
An imperforate hymen is the presence of tissue that completely covers the vaginal opening. It is cut to allow menstrual flow to exit during a short surgical procedure. A hymenorrhaphy is the surgical procedure that reconstructs the hymen.

=== Balloon vaginoplasty ===
In this procedure, a Foley catheter is laparoscopically inserted to the rectouterine pouch whereupon gradual traction and distension are applied to create a neovagina.

=== Pull through or Vecchietti procedure ===
In treating Müllerian agenesis, the Vecchietti procedure is a laparoscopic surgical technique that produces a vagina of dimensions (depth and width) comparable to those of a natal vagina (ca. 8 cm deep). A small, plastic sphere called an olive is threaded (sutured) against the vaginal area; the threads are drawn through the vaginal skin, up through the abdomen, and through the navel. There, the threads are attached to a traction device, and then daily are drawn tight so that the olive is pulled inwards and stretches the vagina, by approximately 1 cm per day, thereby creating a vagina, approximately 7 cm deep by 7 cm wide, in 7 days. The mean operating room (OR) time for the Vecchietti vaginoplasty is approximately 45 minutes; yet, depending upon the patient and her indications, the procedure might require more time. The outcomes of Vecchietti technique via the laparoscopic approach are found to be comparable to the procedure using laparotomy. In vaginal hypoplasia, traction vaginoplasty such as the Vecchietti technique seems to have the highest success rates both anatomically (99%) and functionally (96%) among available treatments.

Other surgical techniques that have been developed include ileal neovagina (Monti's technique), Creatsas vaginoplasty, Wharton–Sheares–George neovaginoplasty, or the Davydov procedure. The most widely used is the Vecchietti laparoscopic procedure. Sometimes sexual intercourse can result in the dilation of a newly constructed vagina.

=== Vaginal dilators and expanders ===
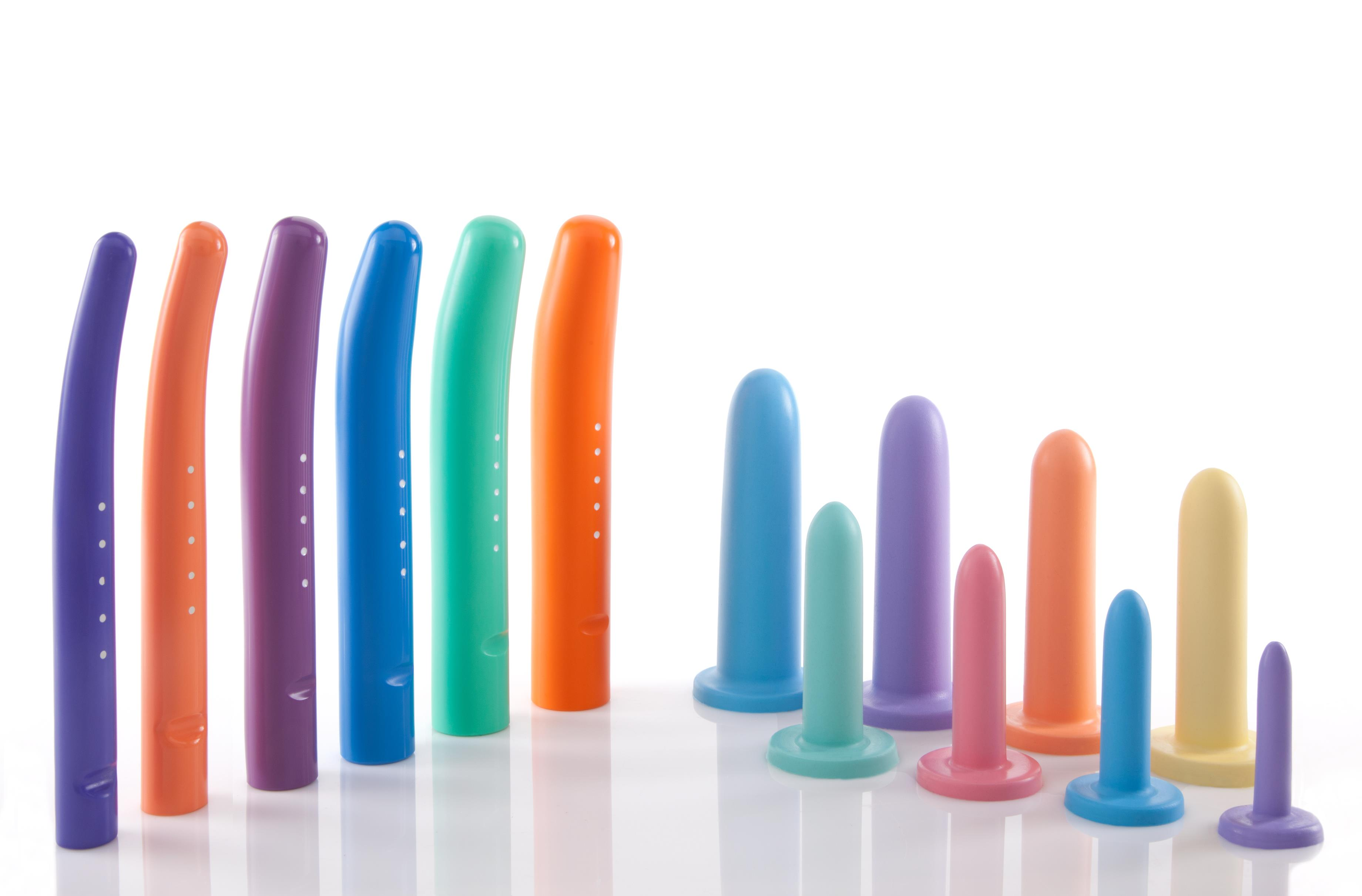
Plastic and silicone vaginal dilators

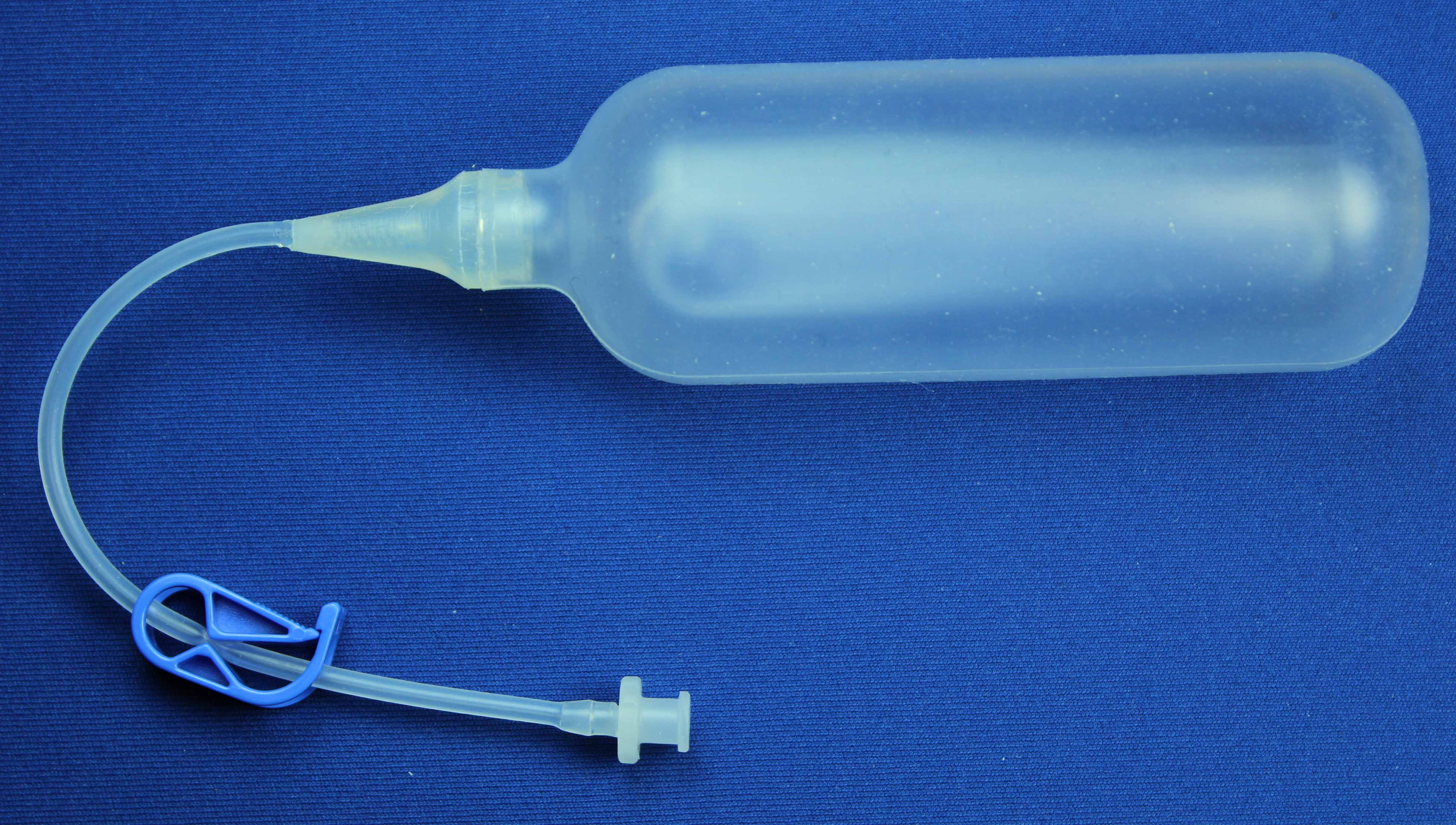
Vaginal expander ZSI 200 NS

Following vaginoplasty, inflatable vaginal expanders, or plastic or silicone vaginal dilators or stents are used to measure and maintain the length and diameter of the neovaginal canal. At the end of the procedure the device may stay in place to maintain the neovagina against the pelvic wall which also favors the process of microscopic neovascularization and reduces the risks of hematoma. In post-operative setting the expander can be used regularly to prevent post-operative vaginal retraction. Instead of using a vaginal expander, many surgeons nowadays opt to use a vaginal packing soaked in antibiotic solution and surgical lubricant immediately post-op, which is removed after a few days, upon which vaginal dilation using vaginal dilators starts.

Solid vaginal dilators or stents made from plastic or silicone are also used during surgery to keep the passage from attachments, and post-operatively to maintain the viability of the neovagina to loss of depth or length of the vaginal canal. The frequency of post-surgical dilation varies from multiple times daily, to every few days. The frequency required to use decreases over time, but some amount of dilation is typically a lifelong requirement.

== Risks and complications ==
Reconstructive vaginoplasty in children and adolescents carries the risk of superinfection.

In adults, rates and types of complications varied with gender-affirming surgery. Necrosis of the clitoral region was 1–3%. Necrosis of the surgically created vagina was 3.7–4.2%. Vaginal shrinkage occurred was documented in 2–10% of those treated. Stricture, or narrowing of the vaginal orifice was reported in 12–15% of the cases. Of those reporting stricture, 41% underwent a second operation to correct the condition. Necrosis of two scrotal flaps has been described. Posterior vaginal wall is a rare complication. Genital pain was reported in 4–9%. Rectovaginal fistula is also rare with 1% documented. Vaginal prolapse was seen in 1–2% of people assigned male at birth undergoing this procedure.

The ability of emptying the bladder was affected for some patients after this procedure: 13% reported improvement, 68% said that there was no change and 19% reported that voiding got worse. Those reporting a negative outcome who experienced loss of bladder control and urinary incontinence were 19%. Urinary tract infections occurred in 32% of those treated.

== History ==
Reports of people seeking vaginoplasty go back to the 2nd century. The first modern vaginoplasty was performed in 1931 on Dora Richter. Lili Elbe also underwent a vaginoplasty the same year.

== See also ==
- Intersex medical interventions
- Feminizing surgery
- List of transgender-related topics
- Enterocele
- Sigmoidocele

== Bibliography ==
- Baggish, Michael (2016). Atlas of pelvic anatomy and gynecologic surgery. Philadelphia, PA: Elsevier. ISBN 978-0-323-22552-6.
- Emans, Herriot (2011). Emans, Laufer, Goldstein's pediatric & adolescent gynecology. Philadelphia: Wolters Kluwer Health/Lippincott Williams & Wilkins Health. ISBN 978-1-60831-648-9.^{electronic book, no page numbers.}
