= Retropubic paravaginal repair =

Medical procedure to reattach tissue to stabilize the vagina

- Specialty: Gynaecology

A retropubic paravaginal repair is the surgical procedure to reattach the anterior lateral vaginal wall and its connective tissue to its normal position in the pelvis to correct pelvic organ prolapse. It may be necessary to preserve normal function of pelvic organs after the vagina has detached from its normal position and has moved along with underlying tissues away from the pelvic sidewall. A common finding in repairing this condition is that the arcus tendineus fasciae has become detached. The procedure is usually performed by a gynecological surgeon using pelvic surgery techniques.

Women who experience stress incontinence and who need a paravaginal repair often receive a Burch colposuspension to correct the problem.
