= Rugosity =

Measure of small-scale variations of amplitude in the height of a surface

Rugosity, f_{r}, is a measure of small-scale variations of amplitude in the height of a surface,

$$f_{\text{r}} = A_{\text{r}}/A_{\text{g}}$$

where A_{r} is the real (true, actual) surface area and A_{g} is the macroscopic geometric surface area.

== Utility ==
Rugosity calculations are commonly used in materials science to characterize surfaces, amongst others, in marine science to characterize seafloor habitats. A common technique to measure seafloor rugosity is Risk's chain-and-tape method but with the advent of underwater photography less invasive quantitative methods have been developed. Some examples include measuring small-scale seafloor bottom roughness from microtopographic laser scanning (Du Preez and Tunnicliffe 2012), and deriving multi-scale measures of rugosity, slope and aspect from benthic stereo image reconstructions (Friedman et al. 2012).

== Alternative ==
Despite the popularity of using rugosity for two- and three-dimensional surface analyses, methodological inconsistency has been problematic. Building off recent advances, the arc-chord ratio (ACR) rugosity index is capable of measuring the rugosity of two-dimensional profiles and three-dimensional surfaces using a single method (Du Preez 2015). The ACR rugosity index is defined as the contoured (real) surface area divided by the area of the surface orthogonally projected onto a plane of best fit (POBF), where the POBF is a function (linear interpolation) of the boundary data only. Using a POBF, instead of an arbitrary horizontal geometric plane, results in an important advantage of the ACR rugosity index: unlike most rugosity indices, ACR rugosity is not affected by slope.

== Applications ==
Ecology: As a measure of complexity, rugosity is presumed to be an indicator of the amount of available habitat available for colonization by benthic organisms (those attached to the seafloor), and shelter and foraging area for mobile organisms.

Geology: For marine geologists and geomorphologists, rugosity is a useful characteristic in distinguishing different types of seafloors in remote sensing applications (e.g., sonar and laser altimetry, based from ships, planes or satellites).

Oceanography: Among oceanographers, rugosity is recognized to influence small-scale hydrodynamics by converting organized laminar or oscillatory flow into energy-dissipating turbulence.

Coral biology: High rugosity is often an indication of the presence of coral, which creates a complex surface as it grows. A rugose seafloor's tendency to generate turbulence is understood to promote the growth of coral and coralline algae by delivering nutrient-rich water after the organisms have depleted the nutrients from the envelope of water immediately surrounding their tissues.

== See also ==
- Surface roughness – Measure of surface finish or texture
- Fractal – Infinitely detailed mathematical structure
- Fractal dimension – Real-valued number of spatial dimensions
- Glossary of climbing terms: Rugosity
