= Labia minora =

Flaps of skin on either side of the vaginal opening in the vulva

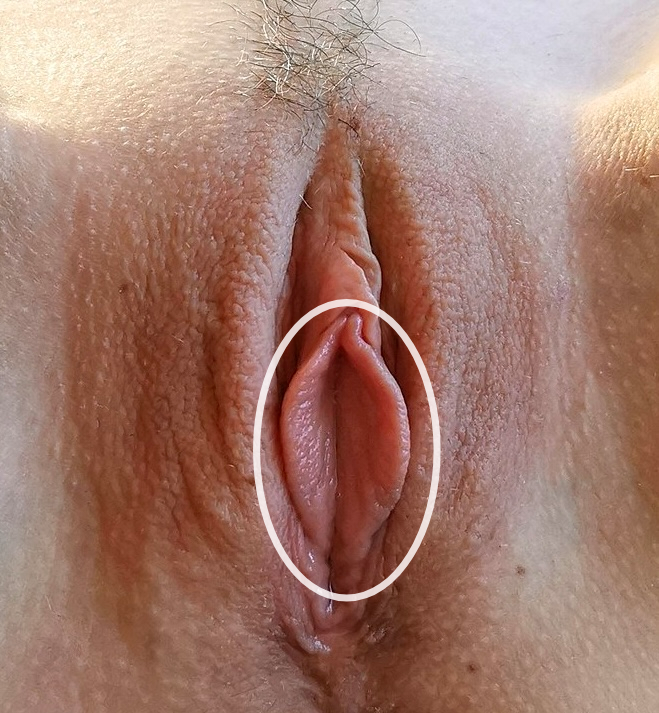
- Hairless human vulva with labia minora encircled between the rounded thicker outer labia majora.

Details
- Precursor: Urogenital folds
- Part of: Vulva

Identifiers
- Latin: labium minus pudendi
- TA98: A09.2.01.007
- TA2: 3553
- FMA: 20374

The labia minora (Latin for 'smaller lips', sing.: labium minus), also known as the inner labia, inner lips, or nymphae, are two flaps of skin that are part of the primate vulva, extending outwards from the inner vaginal and urethral openings to encompass the vestibule. At the glans clitoridis, each labium splits, above forming the clitoral hood, and below the frenulum of the clitoris. At the bottom, the labia meet at the labial commissure. The labia minora vary widely in size, color, and shape from individual to individual.

The labia minora are situated between the labia majora and together form the labia. The labia minora are homologous to the penile raphe and ventral penile skin in males.

== Structure and functioning ==
The labia minora extend from the clitoris obliquely downward, laterally, and backward on either side of the vulval vestibule, ending between the bottom of the vulval vestibule and the labia majora. The posterior ends (bottom) of the labia minora are usually joined across the midline by a flap of skin, named the frenulum of labia minora.

On the front, each lip forks, dividing into two portions surrounding the clitoris. The upper part of each lip passes above the clitoris to meet the upper part of the other lip—which will often be a little larger or smaller—forming a fold that overhangs the glans clitoridis (clitoral tip or head); this fold is named the clitoral hood. The lower part passes beneath the glans clitoridis and becomes united to its under surface, forming, with the inner lip of the opposite side, the frenulum clitoridis.

The clitoral hood typically covers the shaft and sometimes the glans — which is highly sensitive to touch — helping protect the clitoris from mechanical irritation and dryness. However, the hood is movable and can slide during clitoral erection or be gently pulled back to increase exposure of the clitoris to sexual stimulation.

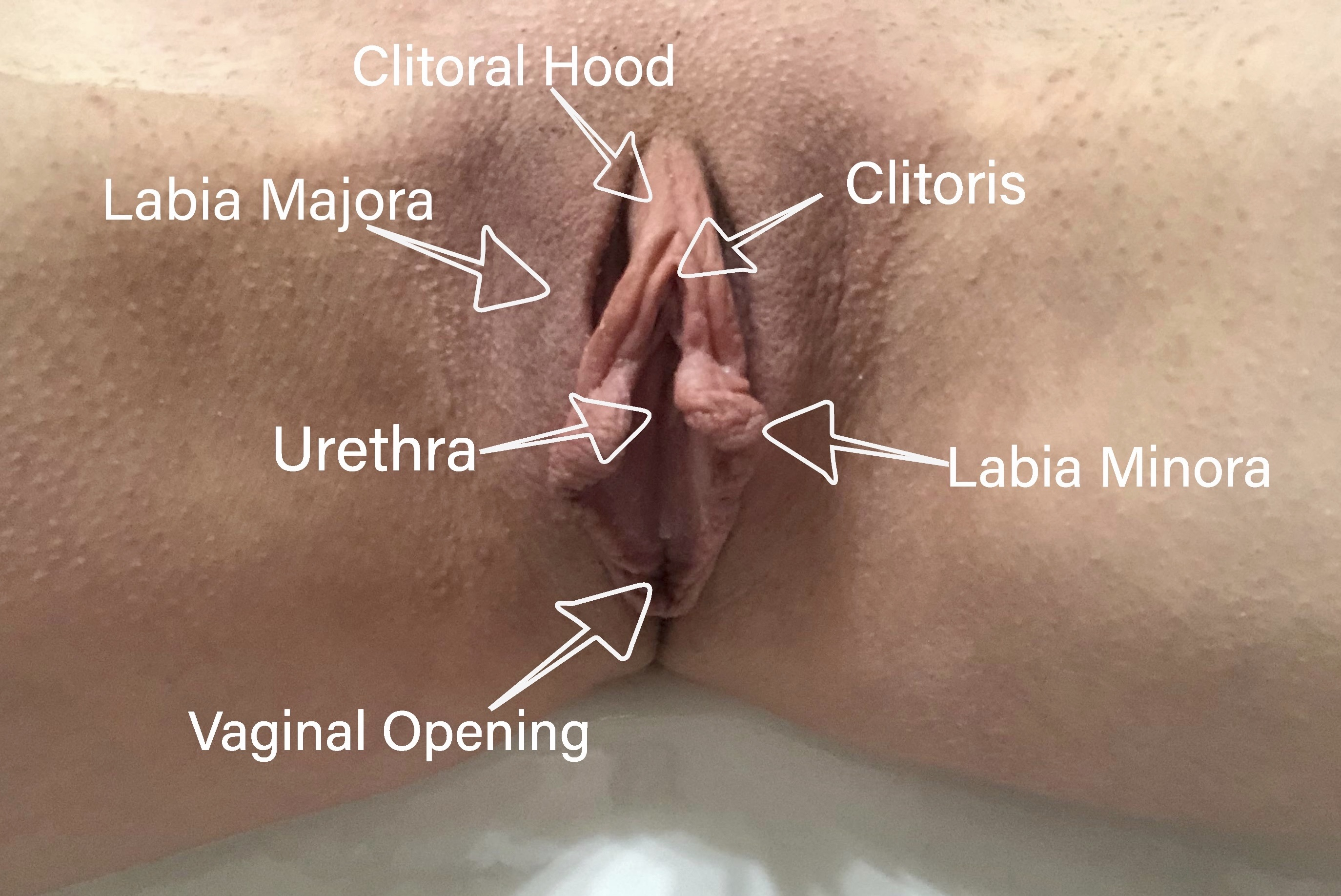
Labeled close-up photograph of the human vulva, showing the labia natural variation of labia minora.

=== Histology ===
On the opposed surfaces of the labia minora are numerous sebaceous glands not associated with hair follicles. They are lined by stratified squamous epithelium on those surfaces.

Like the whole area of the vulval vestibule, the mucus secreted by those glands protects the labia from dryness and mechanical irritation.

=== Variation ===
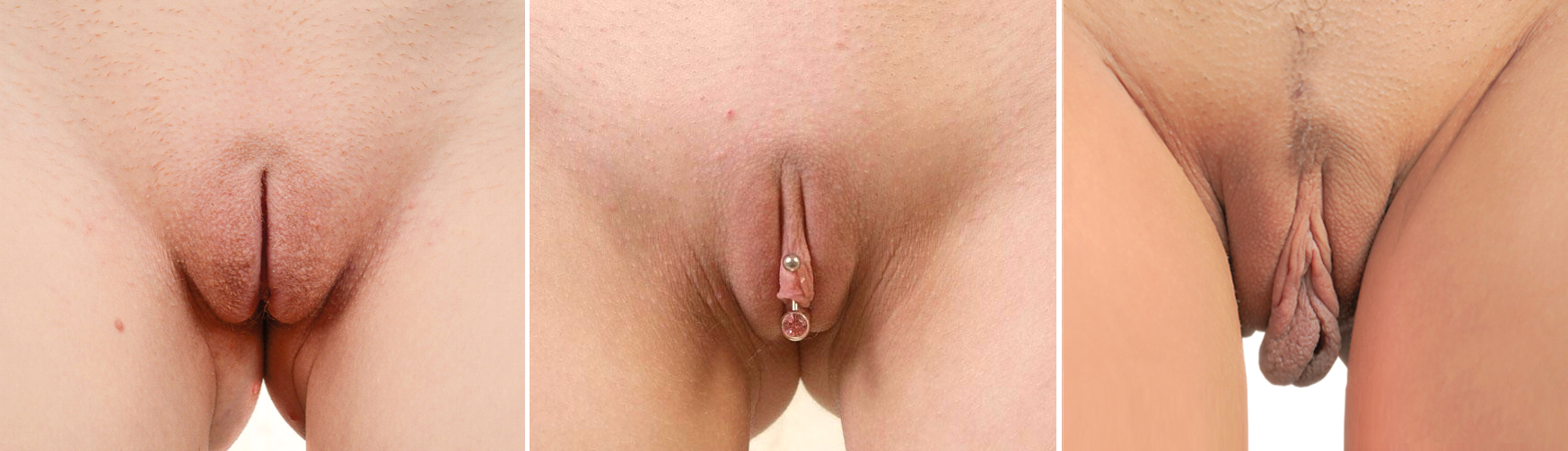
The individual size, coloration, and shapes of the labia minora are subject to significant variability between women. The labia minora are completely covered by the labia majora in some women in a standing posture, while in others they protrude visibly from the pubic cleft.

Being thinner than the outer labia, the inner labia can also be more narrow than the former, or wider than the labia majora, thus protruding in the pudendal cleft and making the term minora (Latin for smaller) essentially inapplicable in these cases. They can also be smooth or frilled, the latter being more typical of longer or wider inner labia.

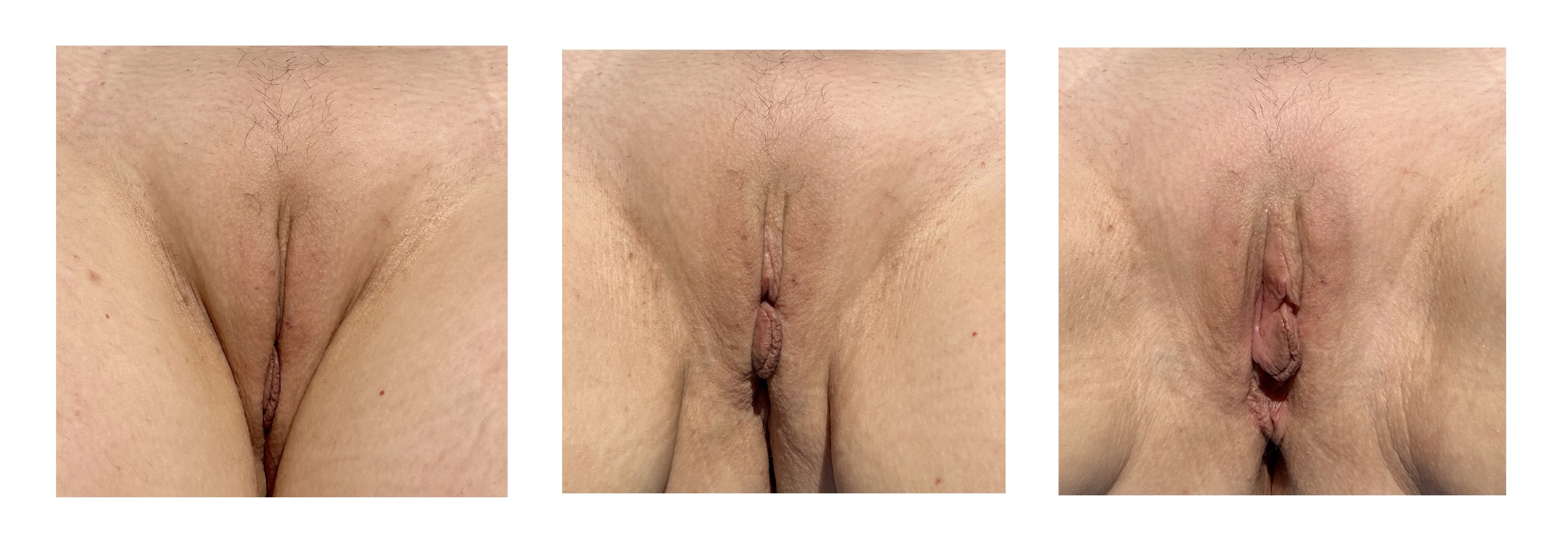
The appearance of the labia minora varies depending on the position of the legs. On the left, with the legs closed, the labia minora is almost completely covered by the labia majora. In the center, with the legs slightly open, the labia minora becomes partially visible. On the right, with the legs fully open, the labia minora is completely visible, along with the clitoral hood.

From 2003 to 2004, researchers from the Department of Gynaecology, Elizabeth Garrett Anderson Hospital in London, measured the labia and other genital structures of 50 women from the ages of 18 to 50, with a mean age of 35.6. The study has since been criticized for its "small and homogenous sample group" consisting primarily of white women. The results were:

Measurement	Range	Mean [SD]
Clitoral length (mm)	5–35	19.1 [8.7]
Clitoral glans width (mm)	3–10	5.5 [1.7]
Clitoris to urethra (mm)	16–45	28.5 [7.1]
Labia majora length (cm)	7.0–12.0	9.3 [1.3]
Labia minora length (mm)	20–100	60.6 [17.2]
Labia minora width (mm)	5–60	21.8 [9.4]
Perineum length (mm)	15–55	31.3 [8.5]
Vaginal length (cm)	6.5–12.5	9.6 [1.5]

Feature	Value	Frequency
Tanner stage (n)	IV	4
Tanner stage (n)	V	46
Colour of genital area compared with surrounding skin (n)	Same	9
Colour of genital area compared with surrounding skin (n)	Darker	41
Rugosity of labia (n)	Smooth	14
Rugosity of labia (n)	Moderate	34
Rugosity of labia (n)	Marked	2

The appearance of the labia minora and other elements of the female genital organ also varies significantly by factors such as age, weight, and skin color.

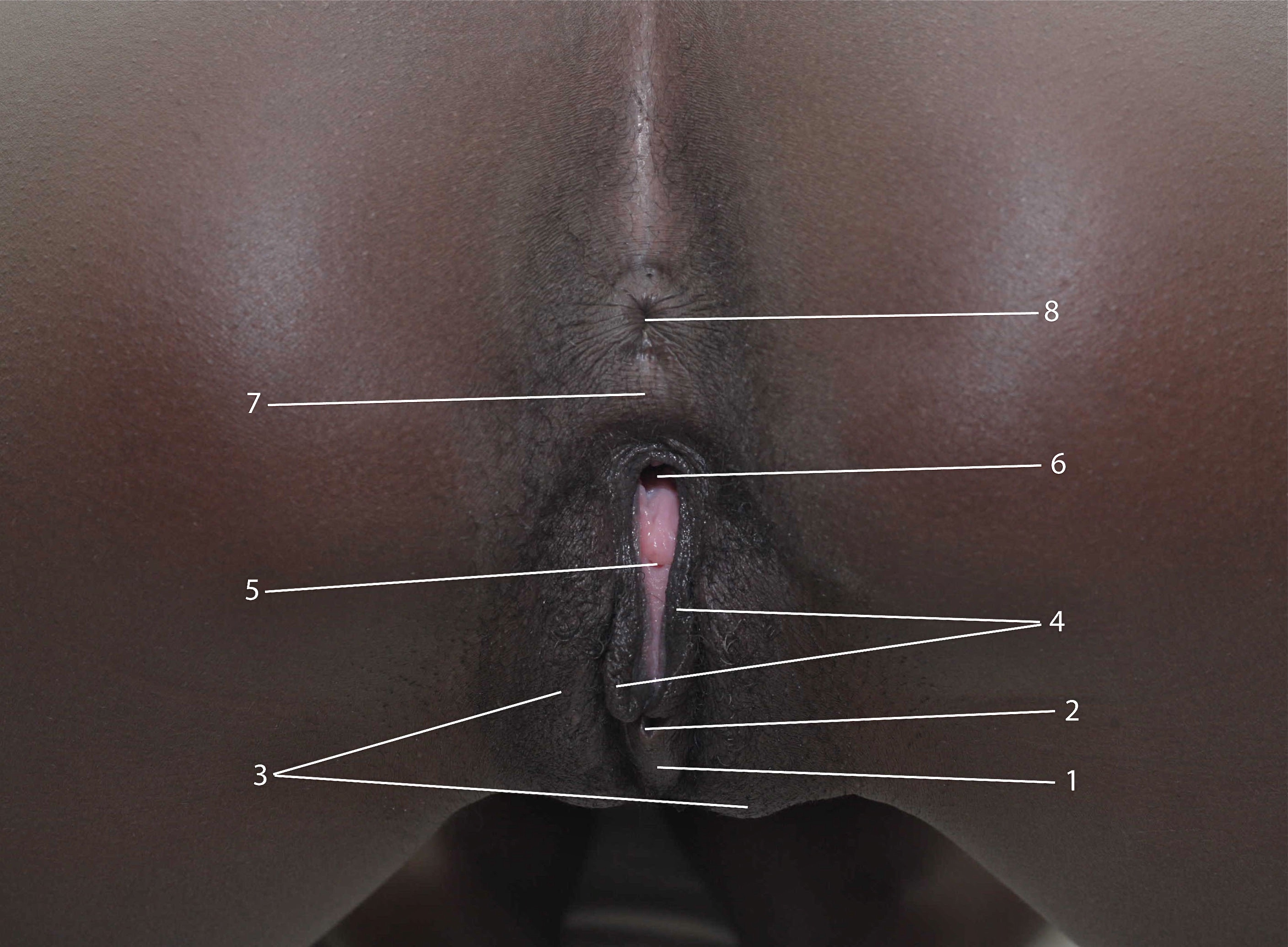
Black genitalia showing black-skinned labia minora, identified by the number 4.

Due to the frequent portrayal of the pudendal cleft without protrusion in art and pornography, there has been a rise in the popularity of labiaplasty, surgery to alter the labia, usually, to make them smaller. On the other hand, there is an opposite movement of labia stretching. Its proponents stress the beauty of long labia and their positive role in sexual stimulation of both partners.

Labiaplasty is also sometimes sought by women who have asymmetrical labia minora to adjust the shape of the structures towards an identical size.

Labia stretching has traditionally been practised in some African nations in the East and South and the South Pacific.

=== Functioning ===
The inner lips serve to protect from mechanical irritation, dryness, and infections of the highly sensitive area of the vulval vestibule with vaginal and urethral openings in it between them. During vaginal intercourse, they may contribute to the stimulation of the whole vestibule area, the clitoris and the vagina of the woman, and the penis of her partner. Stimulation of the clitoris may occur through tension of the clitoral hood and its frenulum by the inner labia pulling at them. During sexual arousal, they are lubricated by the mucus secreted in the vagina and around it to make penetration painless and protect them from irritation.

As the female external urethral opening (meatus) is also situated between the labia minora, they may play a role in guiding the stream of the urine during female urination.

=== Medical conditions ===
Being very sensitive by their structure to any irritation, and situated in the excretion area where traces of urine, vaginal discharge, smegma, and even feces may be present, the inner lips may be susceptible to inflammatory infections of the vulva such as vulvitis.

The likelihood of inflammation may be reduced through appropriate regular hygienic cleansing of the whole vulval vestibule, using water and medically tested cleansing agents designed for vulvas. To avoid contamination of the vulva with fecal bacteria, it is recommended that the vulva be washed only from front to back, from mons pubis to the perineum and anus. Apart from water and special liquid cleansing agents (lotions), there are commercially available wet wipes for female intimate hygiene. Some women wipe the vulval vestibule dry with toilet tissue after urination to avoid irritation and infections from residual drops of urine in the area.

However, incorrect choice of cleansing agents, or their incorrect application, may itself cause labial irritation and require medical attention. Over-vigorous rubbing of the labia of little girls while washing, combined with the lack of estrogen in their bodies, may lead to the (usually) pediatric condition known as labial fusion. If fused labia prevent urination, urine may accumulate and cause pain and inflammation.

In adult females, irritation of the area may be caused by wearing too-tight underwear (especially where wider inner labia protrude in the pudendal cleft); while G-strings, which rub against the labia during body movements, may cause irritation or lead to infection from bacteria transferred from either the external environment or the anus.

== Other animals ==
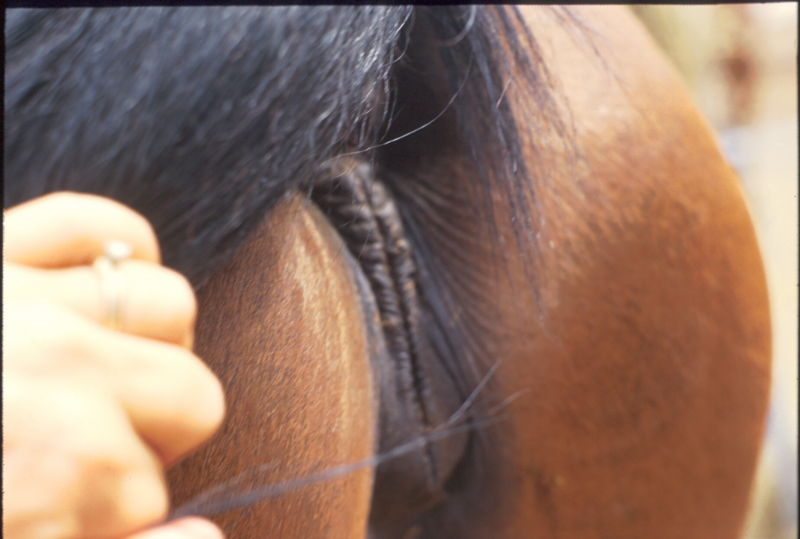
A horse's labia vulvae

The labia minora in non-primate placental mammals (namely Euungulata and Carnivora) are a sole pair of small labia that protect the internal vestibule and are often called the labia vulvae or simply labia. In primates, they are called labia minora to differentiate them from the labia majora, the latter of which are a feature only present in the Primates order.

When the labia vulvae are closed together, they form a pudendal cleft. The joining of the labia vulvae top and bottom is respectively referred to as the anterior and posterior commissures.

== See also ==
- Femalia
- Labia pride
- Labia stretching
- Labiaplasty
