= Clitoral hood =

Part of the vulva that covers and protects the glans of the clitoris

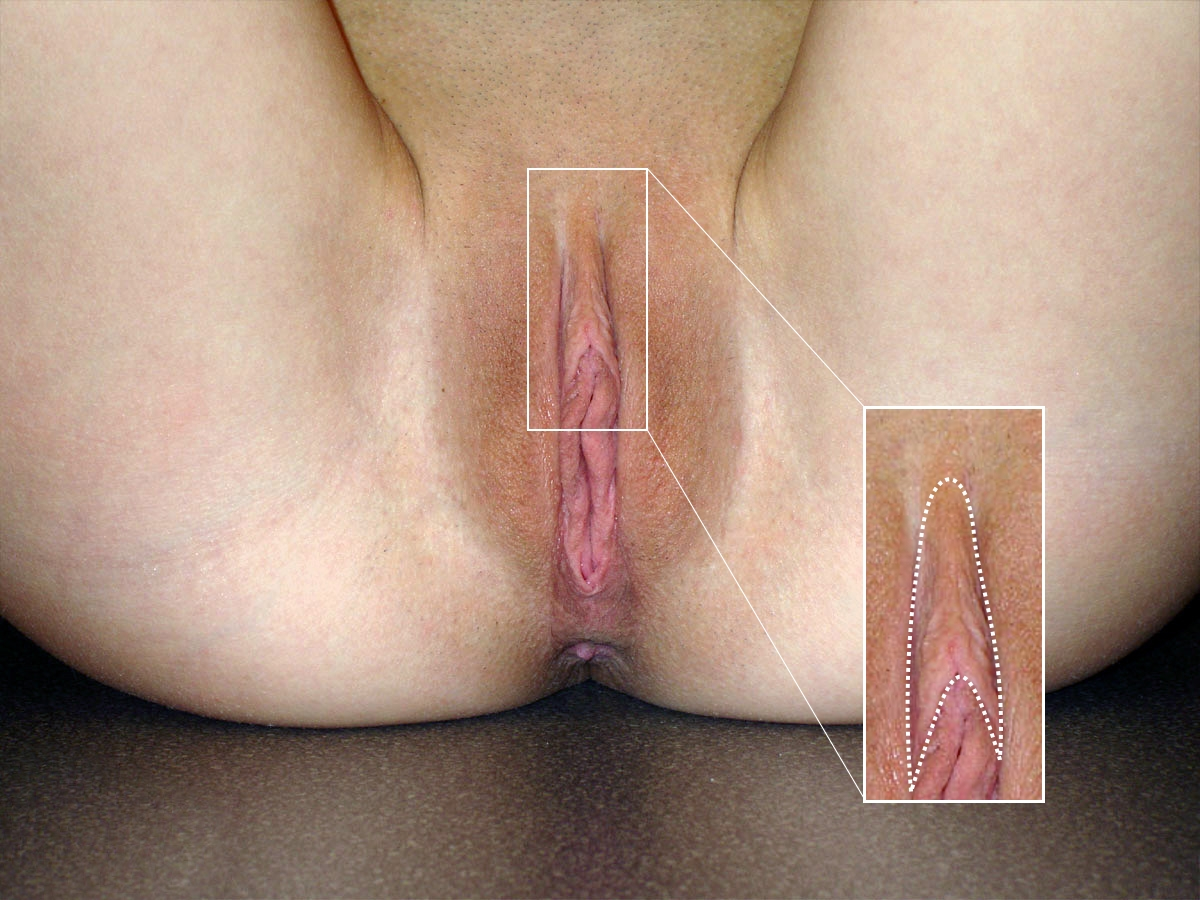
- A photograph of a human vulva with outlined clitoral hood

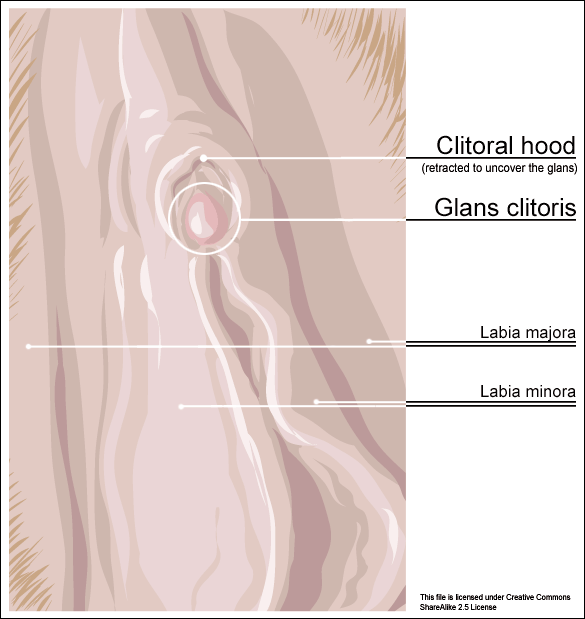
- Outer anatomy of the clitoris.

Details
- Precursor: Genital tubercle, urogenital folds
- System: Reproductive system

Identifiers
- Latin: preputium clitoridis
- TA98: A09.2.01.009
- TA2: 3555
- FMA: 20169

In female humans and other mammals, the clitoral hood (also called preputium clitoridis, clitoral prepuce, and clitoral foreskin) is a fold of skin that surrounds and protects the glans of the clitoris; it also covers the external clitoral shaft, develops as part of the labia minora and is homologous with the foreskin (also called the prepuce) in the male reproductive system. The clitoral hood is composed of mucocutaneous tissues; these tissues are between the mucous membrane and the skin, and they may have immunological importance because they may be a point of entry for mucosal vaccines.

== Development and variation ==
The clitoral hood is formed during the fetal stage by the cellular lamella. The cellular lamella grows down on the dorsal side of the clitoris and is eventually fused with the clitoris.

The clitoral hood varies in size, shape, thickness, and other aesthetic aspects. Some women have large clitoral hoods that completely cover the clitoral glans. Some of these can be retracted to expose the clitoral glans, such as for hygiene purposes or for pleasure; others do not retract. Other women have smaller hoods that do not cover the full length of the clitoral glans, leaving the clitoral glans exposed all the time. Sticky bands of tissue called adhesions can form between the hood and the glans; these stick the hood onto the glans so the hood cannot be pulled back to expose the glans, and smegma can accumulate.

== Stimulation ==
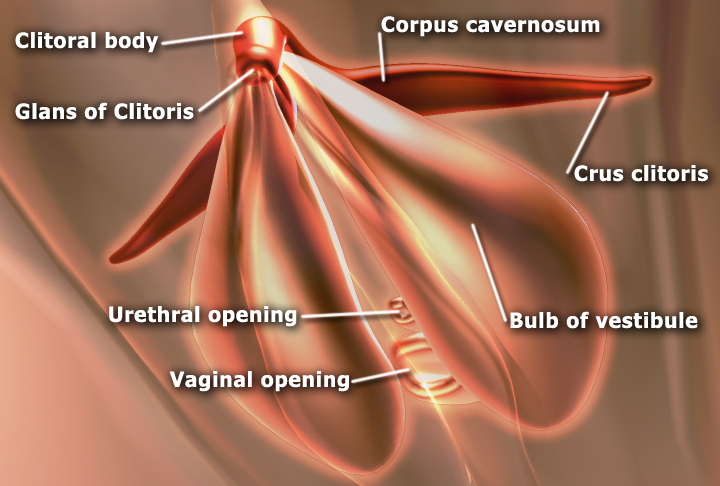
Shows the sub-areas of the clitoris. Areas include the clitoral glans, body, and crura. Also shows vestibular bulbs and corpora cavernosa.

The clitoral glans itself is very sensitive and its direct stimulation, such as in cases where the hood is retracted, is often not enjoyable. Females with hoods covering most of the clitoral glans can often masturbate by stimulating the hood over the clitoral glans; those with smaller, or more compact, structures tend to rub the clitoral glans and hood together. The clitoral hood protects the clitoral glans, and is homologous to the foreskin on the penile glans.

== Modifications ==
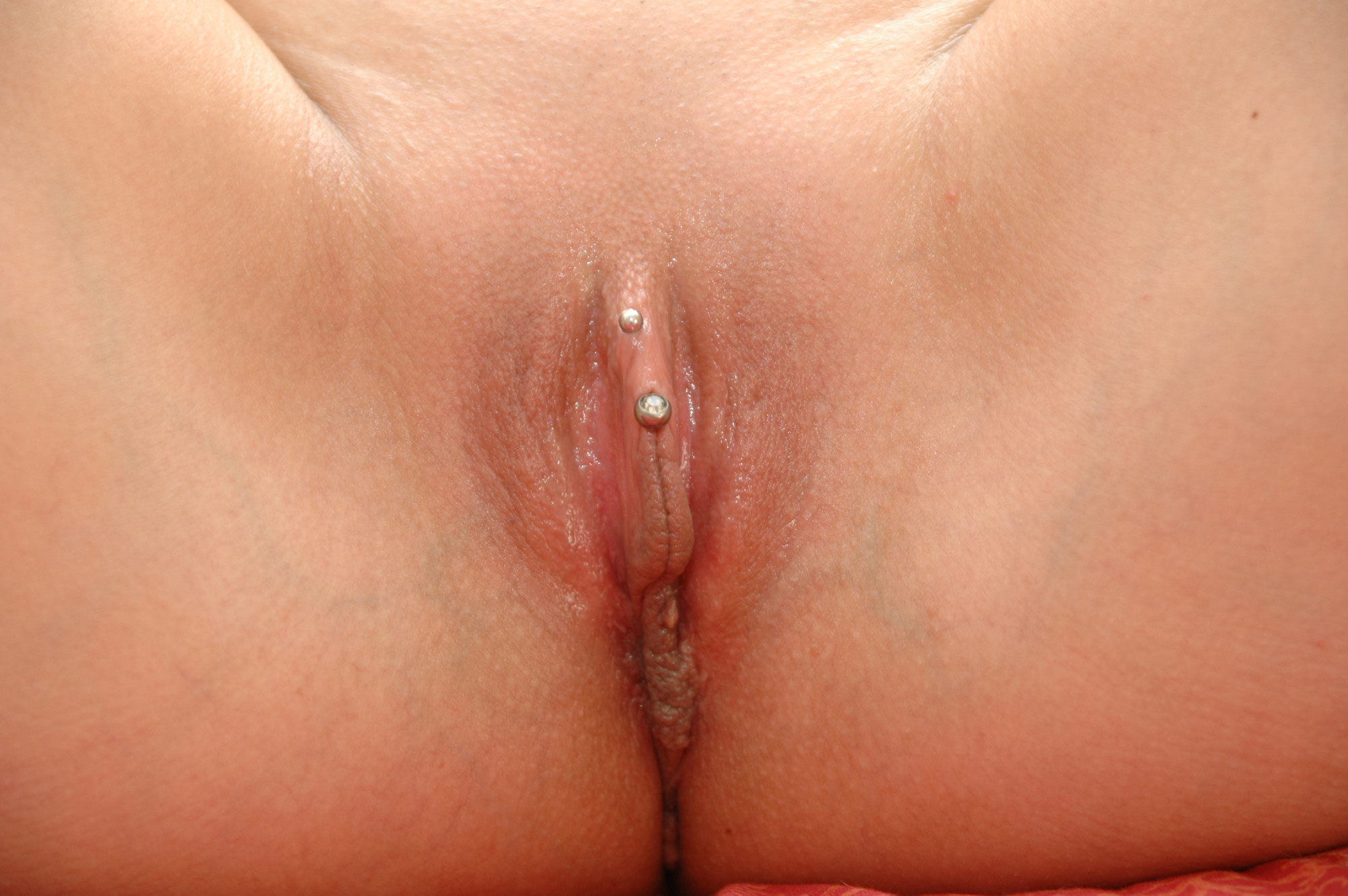
A vulva with a vertical clitoral hood piercing

In most of the world, clitoral modifications are uncommon. In some cultures, female genital mutilation (FGM) is practiced as a rite of passage into womanhood, is perceived as an improvement to the appearance of the genitalia, or is used to suppress or reduce female sexual desire and pleasure (including masturbation). During the late nineteenth and early twentieth centuries, FGM was performed on many children in Western countries, including the United States, to discourage masturbation and reduce diseases believed to relate to it.

One modification that females sometimes choose is to have the hood pierced and insert jewelry, both for adornment and physical pleasure. Though less common, other females opt to have their own hood surgically trimmed or removed to permanently expose part or all of the clitoral glans.

== Other animals ==
Regarding the clitoral prepuce in non-primate mammals, there is a similar structure typically referred to as the clitoral sheath, which is homologous to the penile sheath in male mammals.

== See also ==
- Frenulum clitoridis: a frenulum below the clitoris
- Prepuce (disambiguation)
