= Genital reconstructive surgery =

Genital reconstructive surgery may refer to:

- Clitoridectomy, any surgery to reduce or remove tissue from the clitoris
- Foreskin restoration, a process of expanding penile skin to mimic the foreskin
- Hypospadias, surgery to modify the location of the urinary outlet on a phallus
- Intersex medical interventions, performed to modify atypical or ambiguous genitalia
  - For a historical perspective, see History of intersex surgery
- Labiaplasty, plastic surgery to alter the vulva's folds of skin
- Phalloplasty, the construction or reconstruction of a penis
- Metoidioplasty, the construction of a penis from a hormonally-enlarged clitoris in masculinizing surgery
- Gender-affirming surgery, to alter a person's existing sex characteristics to resemble those of their identified gender
  - Masculinizing surgery, a variety of procedures for transgender men
  - Feminizing surgery, a variety of procedures for transgender women
- Scrotoplasty, the construction or reconstruction of a scrotum
- Vaginoplasty, any type of surgical procedure to the vagina or related structures
- Vulvoplasty, the construction or reconstruction of a vulva

== See also ==
- Circumcision, removal of the foreskin from the human penis
- Penile implant, implantation of a penile prosthesis to treat various disorders
- Female genital mutilation, the ritual removal of some or all of the vulva
- Genital modification and mutilation, permanent or temporary changes to human sex organs
