= Miroslav Djordjevic =

Serbian genital surgeon

Miroslav L. Djordjevic
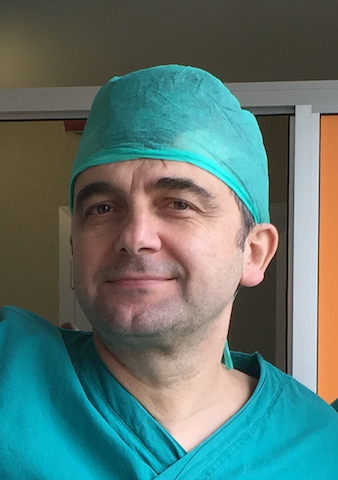
- Djordjevic in 2016
- Born: Miroslav Đorđević; 10 February 1965 (age 61); Kruševac, SR Serbia
- Education: 1984–1991, Belgrade University, School of Medicine
- Occupation: Surgeon specializing in genital reconstructive surgery
- Years active: 1992–Present
- Children: 2
- Website: genitalsurgerybelgrade.com

Signature
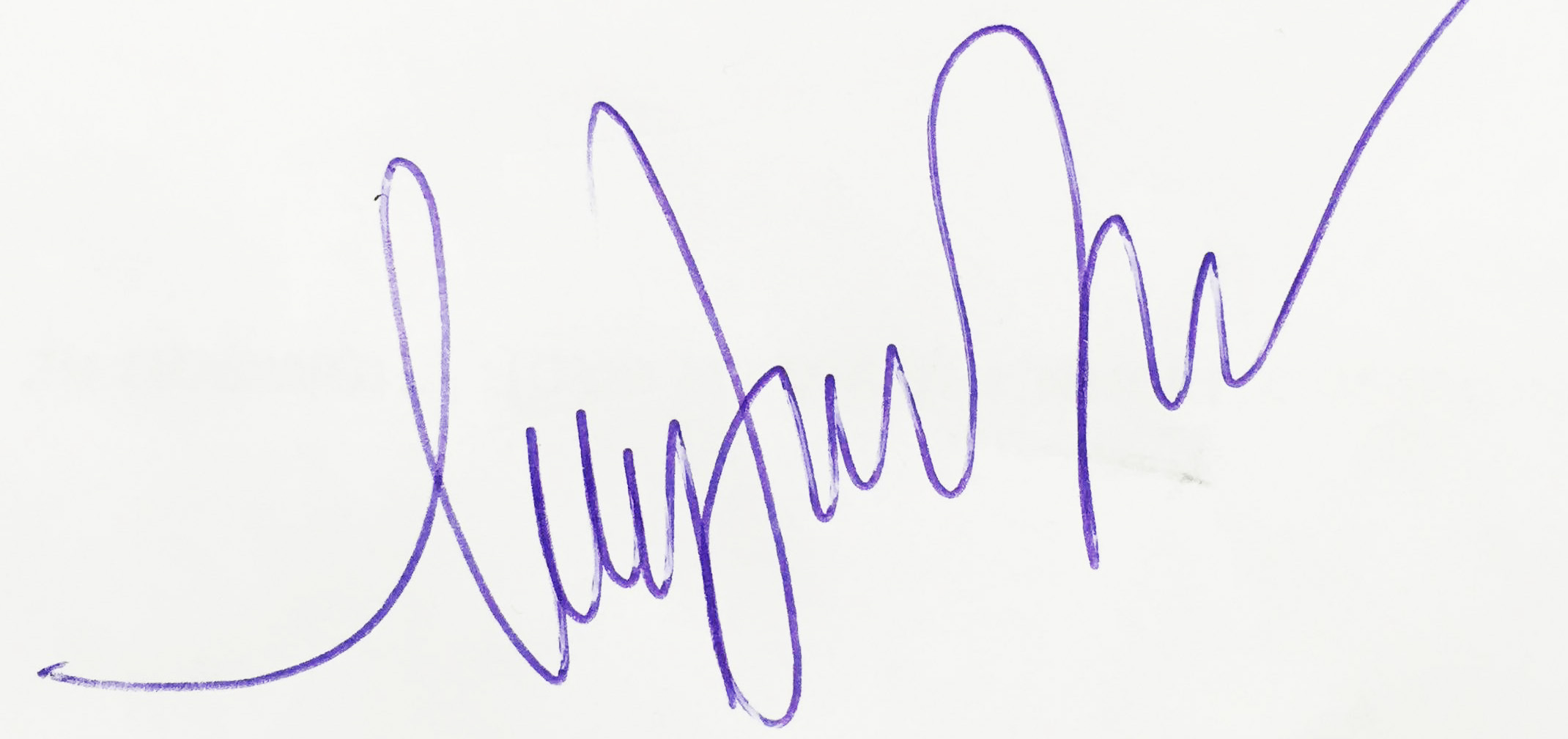

Miroslav L. Djordjevic (Serbian: Miroslav Đorđević) is a Serbian surgeon specializing in genital reconstructive surgery and a professor of urology at the School of Medicine, University of Belgrade, Serbia and a surgeon at the Icahn School of Medicine at Mount Sinai.

== Early life and education ==
Djordjevic completed his medical studies, including his urology residency, at the University of Belgrade's School of Medicine, in Serbia, in 1991. His PhD thesis, completed in 2003, was titled "A New Approach for Surgical Treatment of Peyronie's Disease".

== Career ==
Djordjevic works in the field of genital reconstructive surgery. Djordjevic has published many papers on the surgical treatment of hypospadias, epispadias, Peyronie's disease, adult hypospadias, buried penis, urethral reconstruction, pediatric reconstructive urology, and penile enhancement surgery, as well as gender affirming genital surgery.

In 2008 he founded the Belgrade Center for Genital Reconstructive Surgery. Under his leadership Belgrade Center has emerged as an international hub for gender reassignment surgery, particularly for female-to-male (FtM) transitions and is now one of 20 facilities worldwide capable of performing multi-organ genital reconstructive procedures. Candidates coming from France, Iran, India, the United States, South Africa, Singapore, and Australia. This medical specialization in Serbia was pioneered by Djordjevic’s mentor, Sava Perovic, in the late 1980s.

=== Research ===
In 2008, Djordjevic jointly authored a paper titled Transsexualism in Serbia: A Twenty-Year Follow-Up Study. In another paper Djordjevic reported that some people regret having undergone gender confirmation procedures, and he has performed reversal surgeries for those detransitioning. He says the demographic most commonly experiencing regret are male-to-female patients who transitioned after the age of 30.

He is working on his project to develop a technique to transplant penises, testicles, and uteruses for transgender persons. He is optimistic that transplantation of genitalia will eventually become standard.

In 2023, he successfully transplanted an ovary, making Serbia the second country in the world to do so.

=== Credentials ===
Since 1999, Djordjevic has been a professor of surgery at the Medical School of Belgrade University. Since 2013, he has been a member of the Academy of Serbian Medical Association.

== Publications ==
=== Books ===
- Perovic, SV; Djordjevic, ML: "Reconstrucao Peniana: Tecnica de Separacao do Penis Como uma Nova Abordagem a Reconstrucao Cirurgica do Orgao", Disfuncao Sexual: Teloken, C; Da Ros, CT; Tannhauser, M (eds.): Revinter, Ltda; Rio de Janeiro; 2003. pp. 192–199. ISBN 85-7309-807-4
- Djordjevic, ML: "Sexual Reassignment Surgery: Male to Female", Aesthetic and Functional Surgery of the Genitalia: Salgado, CJ; Redett R (eds.): Nova Publishers; New York; 2014. ISBN 978-1-62808-511-2
- Djordjevic, ML: "Hypospadias Surgery: Challenges and Limits", Hauppauge: Nova Science Publishers, Inc.; New York. ISBN 978-1-63321-138-4

=== Selected journal articles ===
- Perovic, S.V.; Stanojevic, D.S.; Djordjevic, M.L.J. (2001). "Vaginoplasty in male transsexuals using penile skin and a urethral flap". BJU International. 86 (7): 843–850. doi:10.1046/j.1464-410x.2000.00934.x. PMID 11069412. S2CID 72077955.
- Vujovic, Svetlana; Popovic, Srdjan; Sbutega-Milosevic, Gorica; Djordjevic, Miroslav; Gooren, Louis (2009). "Transsexualism in Serbia: A Twenty-Year Follow-Up Study". The Journal of Sexual Medicine. 6 (4): 1018–1023. doi:10.1111/j.1743-6109.2008.00799.x. PMID 18331254.
- Bubanj, Tatjana B.; Perovic, Sava V.; Milicevic, Ruzica M.; Jovcic, Stevan B.; Marjanovic, Zoran O.; Djordjevic, Miroslav M. (2004). "Sexual Behavior and Sexual Function of Adults After Hypospadias Surgery: A Comparative Study". Journal of Urology. 171 (5): 1876–1879. doi:10.1097/01.ju.0000119337.19471.51. PMID 15076297.
- Perovic, S.V.; Djordjevic, M.L. (2003). "Metoidioplasty: A variant of phalloplasty in female transsexuals". BJU International. 92 (9): 981–985. doi:10.1111/j.1464-410X.2003.04524.x. PMID 14632860. S2CID 11836091.

== See also ==
- List of transgender-related topics
- Transgender health care
- Transitioning (transgender)
