= Gender-affirming surgery =

Surgical procedures to affirm gender identity

- Other names: Gender confirmation surgery, gender reassignment surgery, sex reassignment surgery
- Specialty: Gynecology, urology, maxillofacial surgery, otorhinolaryngology, reconstructive surgery, sexual health
- MeSH: D057830

Gender-affirming surgery (GAS) is a surgical procedure, or a series of procedures, that alters a person's physical appearance and sexual characteristics to resemble those associated with their gender identity. The phrase is most often associated with transgender health care, though many such treatments are also pursued by cisgender individuals. It is also known as sex reassignment surgery (SRS), gender confirmation surgery (GCS), and several other names.

Professional medical organizations have established Standards of Care, which apply before someone can apply for and receive gender-affirming surgeries, including psychological evaluation, and a period of real-life experience living in the desired gender. Feminizing surgeries are surgeries that result in female-looking anatomy, such as vaginoplasty, vulvoplasty and breast augmentation. Masculinizing surgeries are those that result in male-looking anatomy, such as phalloplasty and mastectomy. In addition to gender-affirming surgery, patients may need to follow a lifelong course of masculinizing or feminizing hormone replacement therapy to support the endocrine system.

Sweden became the first country in the world to allow transgender people to change their legal gender after reassignment surgery and provide free hormone treatment, in 1972. Singapore followed soon after in 1973, being the first in Asia.

== Terminology ==
Gender-affirming surgery is known by many other names, including gender-affirmation surgery, sex reassignment surgery, gender reassignment surgery, and gender confirmation surgery. It is also sometimes called a sex change, though this term is usually considered offensive. Top surgery and bottom surgery refer to surgeries on the chest and genitals respectively.

Some transgender people who want medical assistance to transition from one sex to another identify as transsexual.

Trans women and others assigned male at birth may undergo one or more feminizing procedures: genital surgeries such as penectomy (removal of the penis), orchiectomy (removal of the testes), vaginoplasty (construction of a vagina), vulvoplasty (construction of a vulva); as well as breast augmentation, tracheal shave (reduction of the Adam's apple), facial feminization surgery, and voice feminization surgery among others.

Trans men and others assigned female at birth may undergo one or more masculinizing procedures; such as chest reconstruction, mastectomy, breast reduction, hysterectomy (removal of the uterus), oophorectomy (removal of the ovaries), salpingectomy (removal of the fallopian tubes). A penis can be constructed through metoidioplasty or phalloplasty, and a scrotum through scrotoplasty, sometimes enhanced with testicular implants.

As knowledge of non-binary genders expands in the medical community, more surgeons are willing to tailor operations to individual needs. Bigenital operations allow individuals to construct a penis or vagina and retain their original organs. Gender nullification is the removal of all external genitalia except the urethral opening.

Gender-affirming surgery can also refer to operations pursued by cisgender people, such as mammaplasty, penile implant, or testicular implants following orchiectomy.

Gender-affirming surgery is often sensationalized and misrepresented by anti-trans activists through terms such as genital-mutilation surgery.

== Surgical procedures ==
The best-known gender-affirming procedures are those that reshape the genitals, which are also known as genital reassignment surgery, genital reconstruction surgery, sex reassignment surgery, and bottom surgery (the latter is named in contrast to top surgery, which is surgery to the breasts). However, the meaning of "sex reassignment surgery" has been clarified by the medical organization, the World Professional Association for Transgender Health (WPATH), to include any of a larger number of surgical procedures performed as part of a medical treatment for gender dysphoria.

WPATH says medically necessary gender-affirming surgeries include "complete hysterectomy, bilateral mastectomy, chest reconstruction or augmentation ... including breast prostheses if necessary, genital reconstruction (by various techniques which must be appropriate to each patient ...)... and certain facial plastic reconstruction." Other non-surgical procedures are also considered medically necessary treatments by WPATH, including facial hair electrolysis.

=== Genital surgery ===
==== Feminizing ====
For trans women and transfeminine people, genital reconstruction usually involves surgical construction of a vagina. The most common techniques are penile inversion, rectosigmoid vaginoplasty and peritoneal pullthrough vaginoplasty (PPT). Another technique, the non-penile inversion technique, uses perforated scrotal tissue to construct the vaginal canal. A less invasive procedure with reduced postoperative care requirements is vulvoplasty, which creates external female genitalia without a vaginal canal. The downside of this procedure is that it does not allow for penetrative sex.

==== Masculinizing ====
For trans men and transmasculine people, genital reconstruction may involve the construction of a penis through either phalloplasty or metoidioplasty, which is less invasive but results in a smaller penis.

==== Non-binary people ====
Non-binary people may elect to get any of the surgeries listed above, depending on their sex assignment. They may also opt for bigenital or gender nullification surgeries. Bigenital operations include androgynoplasty, a vaginoplasty procedure that retains the penis, or vagina-preserving phalloplasty. These procedures tend to be rarely performed. In 2017, one of the leading UK trans surgeons, James Bellringer, commented that he had never received a request for such procedures.

==== Other considerations ====
Genital surgery may also involve other medically necessary procedures, such as orchiectomy, penectomy, or vaginectomy. Complications of penile inversion vaginoplasty are mostly minor; however, rectoneovaginal fistula (abnormal connection between the neovagina and the rectum) can occur in about 1–3% of patients. These require further surgery to correct.

=== Other surgeries ===
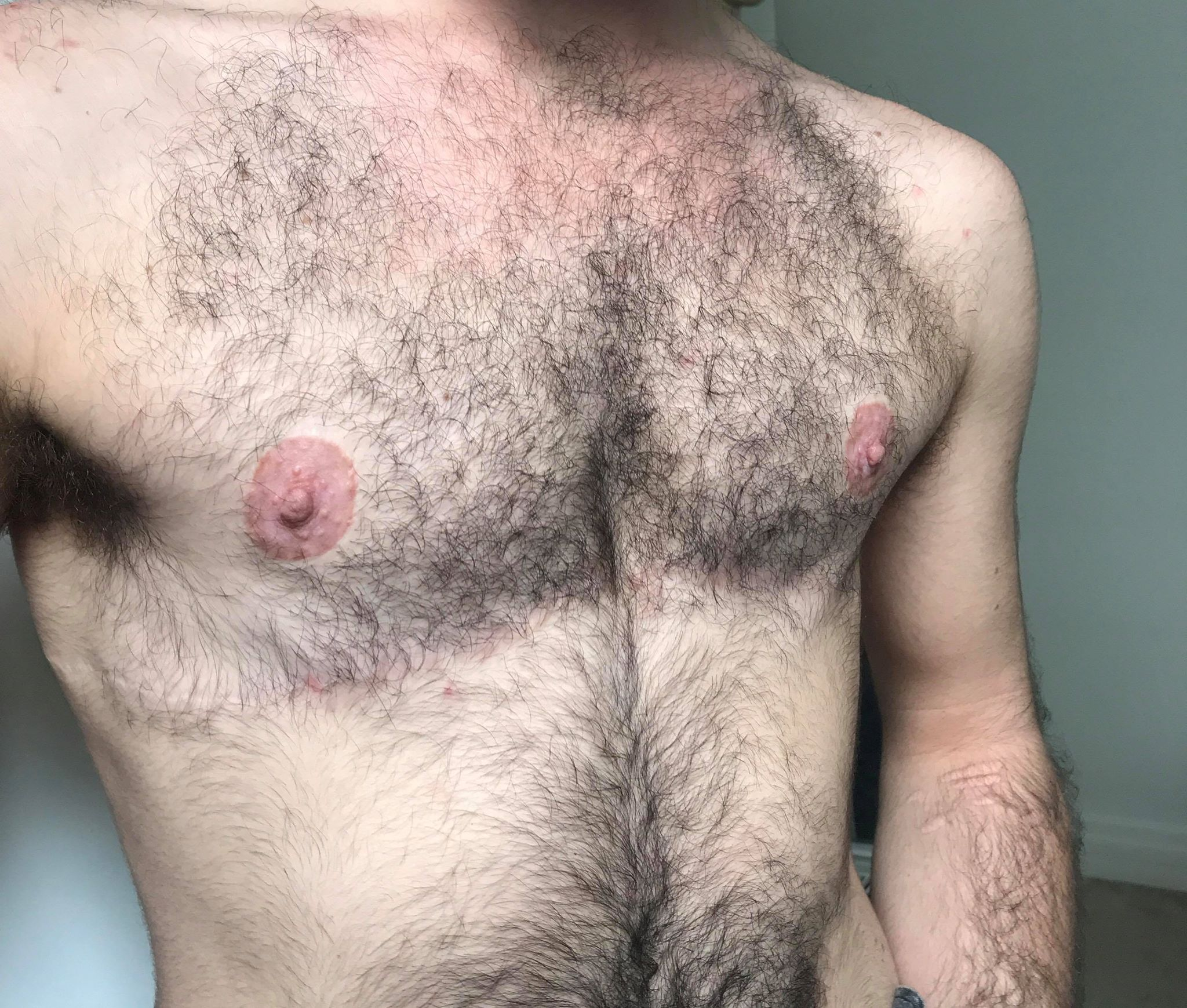
Transgender man with healed double incision chest reconstruction, 2020

As underscored by WPATH, gender transition may entail a variety of non-genital surgeries that change primary or secondary sex characteristics, any of which are considered "gender-affirming surgery" when done to affirm a person's gender identity. For trans men, these may include mastectomy (removal of the breasts) and chest reconstruction (the shaping of a male-contoured chest), or hysterectomy and bilateral salpingo-oophorectomy (removal of ovaries and fallopian tubes). For some trans women, facial feminization surgery, hair transplants, and breast augmentation are also aesthetic components of their surgical treatment. Voice feminizing surgery is a procedure in which the overall pitch range of the patient's voice is reduced. Adam's apple reduction surgery (chondrolaryngoplasty) or tracheal shaving is a procedure in which the most prominent part of the thyroid cartilage is reduced.

There is also Adam's apple enhancement therapy, in which cartilage is used to bring out the Adam's apple in female-to-male patients.

== History ==
Reports of people seeking gender-confirming surgery (vaginoplasty) go back to the 2nd century, such as Roman Emperor Elagabalus.

=== 20th century ===
In the US in 1917, Alan L. Hart, an American tuberculosis specialist, became one of the first trans men to undergo hysterectomy and gonadectomy as treatment of what is now called gender dysphoria.

Dora Richter is the first known trans woman to undergo complete male-to-female genital surgery. She was one of several transgender people in the care of sexologist Magnus Hirschfeld at Berlin's Institute for Sexual Research. In 1922, Richter underwent orchiectomy. In early 1931, a penectomy, followed in June by vaginoplasty.

In 1930–1931, Lili Elbe underwent four sex reassignment surgeries, including orchiectomy, an ovarian transplant, and penectomy. In June 1931, she underwent her fifth surgery, including an experimental uterine transplant and vaginoplasty, which she hoped would allow her to give birth. However, her body rejected the transplanted uterus, and she died of post-operative complications in September, at age 48.

A previous sex reassignment surgery patient was Magnus Hirschfeld's housekeeper, but their name has not been discovered.

Elmer Belt may have been the first U.S. surgeon to perform gender affirmation surgery, in about 1950.

In 1951, Harold Gillies, a plastic surgeon active in World War II, worked to develop the first technique for female-to-male gender-affirming surgery, producing a technique that has become a modern standard, called phalloplasty. Phalloplasty is a reconstructive procedure that produces a functional penis out of grafted tissue from the patient.

In 1971, Roberto Farina performed Brazil's first male-to-female gender-affirming surgery.

In 1984, Jalma Jurado developed a new surgical technique, which he used in surgeries for more than 500 trans women in Brazil and from around the world.

Following phalloplasty, in 1999, the procedure for metoidioplasty was developed for female-to-male surgical transition by the doctors Lebovic and Laub. Considered a variant of phalloplasty, metoidioplasty works to create a penis out of the patient's present clitoris. This allows the patient to have a sensation-perceiving penis head. Metoidioplasty may be used in conjunction with phalloplasty to produce a larger, more "cis-appearing" penis in multiple stages.

=== 21st century ===
On 12 June 2003, the European Court of Human Rights ruled in favor of Carola van Kück, a German trans woman whose insurance company denied her reimbursement for sex reassignment surgery as well as hormone replacement therapy. The legal arguments related to the Article 6 of the European Convention on Human Rights as well as the Article 8. This affair is called van Kück vs Germany.

In 2011, Christiane Völling won the first successful case brought by an intersex person against a surgeon for non-consensual surgical intervention described by the International Commission of Jurists as "an example of an individual who was subjected to sex reassignment surgery without full knowledge or consent".

As of 2017, some European countries require forced sterilization for the legal recognition of sex reassignment. As of 2020, Japan also requires an individual to undergo sterilization to change their legal sex.

The early history of gender-affirming surgery in trans people has been reviewed by various authors.

== Prevalence ==
The prevalence of transgender-related surgeries is difficult to measure and likely underestimated. In 2015, the largest survey of transgender people in the United States reported that 25% of respondents reported had undergone such a surgery.

== Prior to surgery ==
=== Medical considerations ===
Some medical conditions, including diabetes, asthma, and HIV, can lead to complications with future therapy and pharmacological management. Typical gender-affirming surgery procedures involve complex medication regimens, including sex-hormone therapy, throughout and after surgery. Typically, a patient's treatment involves a healthcare team consisting of a variety of providers including endocrinologists, whom the surgeon may consult when determining if the patient is physically fit for surgery. Health providers including pharmacists can play a role in maintaining safe and cost-effective regimens, providing patient education, and addressing other health issues including smoking cessation and weight loss.

People with HIV or hepatitis C may have difficulty finding a surgeon able to perform successful surgery. Many surgeons operate in small private clinics that cannot treat potential complications in these populations. Some surgeons charge higher fees for HIV and hepatitis C-positive patients; other medical professionals assert that it is unethical to deny surgical or hormonal treatments to transgender people solely on the basis of their HIV or hepatitis status.

Fertility is also a factor considered in gender-affirming surgery, as patients are typically informed that if an orchiectomy or oöphoro-hysterectomy is performed, it will make them irreversibly infertile.

=== Gender dysphoric children ===
Gender-affirming surgery is generally not performed on children under 18, though in rare cases may be performed on adolescents if health care providers agree there is an unusual benefit to doing so or risk to not performing it. Preferred treatments for children include puberty blockers and gender affirming hormone therapy, which reduces the need for future surgery. Medical protocols typically require long-term mental health counseling to verify persistent and genuine gender dysphoria before any intervention, and consent of a parent or guardian or court order is legally required in most jurisdictions.

At their annual meeting in summer 2026, the American Medical Association's House of Delegates passed a new policy formally supporting gender-affirming surgeries for minors.

=== Intersex children and cases of trauma ===
Infants born with intersex conditions might undergo interventions at or close to birth. This is controversial because of the human rights implications.

There can be negative outcomes (including PTSD and suicide) when the surgically assigned gender does not match the person's gender identity, which will be realized by the person only later in life. Milton Diamond at the John A. Burns School of Medicine, University of Hawaii recommended that physicians not perform surgery on children until they are old enough to give informed consent and to assign such infants in the gender to which they will probably best adjust. Diamond believed introducing children to others with differences of sex development could help remove shame and stigma. Diamond considered the intersex condition as a difference of sex development, not as a disorder.

=== Standards of care ===
Gender-affirming surgery can be hard to obtain due to financial barriers, insurance coverage, and lack of providers. A growing number of surgeons are now training to perform such surgeries. In many regions, a person's pursuit of gender-affirming surgery is often governed, or at least guided, by documents called Standards of Care for the Health of Transgender and Gender Diverse People (SOC). The most widespread SOC in this field is published and often revised by the World Professional Association for Transgender Health (WPATH, formerly the Harry Benjamin International Gender Dysphoria Association or HBIGDA). Many jurisdictions and medical boards in the US and other countries recognize the WPATH Standards of Care for the treatment of transgender individuals. Some treatment may require a minimum duration of psychological evaluation and living as a member of the target gender full-time, sometimes called the real life experience (RLE) (sometimes mistakenly called the real life test [RLT]) before sex reassignment surgeries are covered by insurance.

Standards of Care usually give certain very specific "minimum" requirements as guidelines for progressing with treatment, causing them to be highly controversial and often maligned documents among transgender patients seeking surgery. Alternative local standards of care exist, such as in the Netherlands, Germany, and Italy. Much of the criticism surrounding the WPATH/HBIGDA-SOC applies to these as well, and some of these SOCs (mostly European SOC) are actually based on much older versions of the WPATH SOC. Other SOCs are entirely independent of the WPATH. The criteria of many of those SOCs are stricter than the latest revision of the WPATH-SOC. Many qualified surgeons in North America and many in Europe adhere almost unswervingly to the WPATH SOC or other SOCs. However, in the United States many experienced surgeons are able to apply the WPATH SOC in ways which respond to an individual's medical circumstances, as is consistent with the SOC.

Many surgeons require two letters of recommendation for gender-affirming surgery. At least one of these letters must be from a mental health professional experienced in diagnosing gender identity disorder (now recognized as gender dysphoria), who has known the patient for over a year. Letters must state that sex reassignment surgery is the correct course of treatment for the patient.

Many medical professionals and many professional associations have stated that surgical interventions should not be required for transsexual individuals to change sex designation on identity documents. However, depending on the legal requirements of many jurisdictions, transsexual and transgender people are often unable to change the listing of their sex in public records unless they can furnish a physician's letter attesting that sex reassignment surgery has been performed. In some jurisdictions legal gender change is prohibited in any circumstances, even after genital or other surgery or treatment.

=== Insurance ===
A growing number of public and commercial health insurance plans in the US now contain defined benefits covering sex reassignment-related procedures, usually including genital reconstruction surgery (MTF and FTM), chest reconstruction (FTM), breast augmentation (MTF), and hysterectomy (FTM). For patients to qualify for insurance coverage, certain insurance plans may require proof of the following:

- a written initial assessment by a qualified licensed mental health professional
- persistent, well-documented gender dysphoria
- months of prior physician-supervised hormone therapy

In June 2008, the American Medical Association (AMA) House of Delegates stated that the denial to patients with gender dysphoria or otherwise covered benefits represents discrimination, and that the AMA supports "public and private health insurance coverage for treatment for gender dysphoria as recommended by the patient's physician." Other organizations have issued similar statements, including WPATH, the American Psychological Association, and the National Association of Social Workers.

In 2017, the United States Defense Health Agency for the first time approved payment for sex reassignment surgery for an active-duty U.S. military service member. The patient, an infantry soldier who is a trans woman, had already begun a course of treatment for gender reassignment. The procedure, which the treating doctor deemed medically necessary, was performed on 14 November at a private hospital, since US military hospitals lack the requisite surgical expertise.

== Post-procedural effects ==
=== Mental health and quality of life ===
Clinical research on long-term quality-of-life outcomes following surgery is limited and confounded by various factors, including small sample sizes, and baseline rates of mental health issues and suicide among transgender people compared to the general population.

A 2020 meta-analysis found "evidence of low quality" that gender-affirming surgery, particularly chest reconstruction for trans men, improves quality of life. A 2022 systematic review found that gender-affirming surgical procedures led to "reduced rates of suicide attempts, anxiety, depression, and symptoms of gender dysphoria along with higher levels of life satisfaction, happiness and QoL after gender-affirming surgery." A 2024 systematic review found that genital surgeries significantly improved depression and dissociation in trans and gender-diverse individuals, with "mixed results" for other mental health outcomes. It concluded there was "less conclusive evidence" of mental health improvement after trans surgical procedures compared to hormonal therapy, though expressed tentative support for both.

A secondary analysis of the U.S. Transgender Survey found that gender-affirming surgery was significantly associated with lower rates of psychological distress, smoking, and suicidal ideation, compared to rates among respondents who desired surgery but had not undergone it. This was the largest controlled study on the subject to date (N=19,960), though the design of the survey and self-reported responses introduced some limitations and possible response bias.

Gender-affirming surgery can be seen as human enhancement.

==== Social obstacles ====
Transgender people often fall victim to different social obstacles which may hinder their experiences with care, such as discrimination, prejudice, harassment, and other stigmatizing behaviours. The rejection faced by trans people is much more severe than what is experienced by lesbians, gays, and bisexuals. Due to these minority stressors, gender-affirming surgery may result in only limited quality of life improvements.

Regret after gender-affirming surgery may also be an outcome of the discrimination transgender individuals face. According to a systematic review published in 2021, "poor social and group support, late-onset gender transition, poor sexual functioning, and mental health problems are factors associated with regret." Nevertheless, it found the prevalence of regret after gender-affirming surgery to be quite low, at around 1% of the 7,928 transgender patients studied.

=== Sexuality ===
Looking specifically at transsexual people's genital sensitivities, both trans men and trans women are capable of maintaining their genital sensitivities after gender-affirming surgery. However, these are contingent upon the procedures and surgical tricks which are used to preserve the sensitivity. Considering the importance of genital sensitivity in helping transsexuals to avoid unnecessary harm or injury to the genitals, allowing trans men to obtain erection by inserting a penile implant after phalloplasty, the ability of trans people to experience erogenous and tactile sensitivity in their reconstructed genitals is one of the essential objectives surgeons want to achieve in gender-affirming surgery. Moreover, studies have also found that the critical procedure for genital sensitivity maintenance and achieving orgasm after phalloplasty is to preserve both the clitoral hood and the clitoris underneath the reconstructed phallus.

Erogenous sensitivity is measured by the abilities to reach orgasm in genital sexual activities, like masturbation and intercourse. Many studies reviewed that both trans men and trans women have reported an increase of orgasms in both sexual activities, implying the possibilities to maintain or even enhance genital sensitivity after gender-affirming surgery.

Most trans persons report enjoying better sex lives and improved sexual satisfaction after gender-affirming surgery. The enhancement of sexual satisfaction was positively related to the satisfaction of new primary sex characteristics. Before gender-affirming surgery, trans patients had unwanted sex organs which they were eager to remove. Hence, they were not enthusiastic about engaging in sexual activity. Transsexual individuals who have undergone gender-affirming surgery are more satisfied with their bodies and experienced less stress when participating in sexual activity.

Most of the individuals report that they have experienced sexual excitement during sexual activity, including masturbation. The ability to obtain orgasm is positively associated with sexual satisfaction. Frequency and intensity of orgasm are substantially different for trans men and trans women. Almost all female-to-male individuals revealed an increase in sexual excitement and can achieve orgasm through sexual activity with a partner or via masturbation, whereas only 85% of the male-to-female individuals are able to achieve orgasm after gender-affirming surgery. A study found that both trans men and trans women reported qualitative change in their experience of orgasm. The female-to-male trans individuals reported that they had been experiencing intensified and stronger excitements and orgasm while male-to-female persons have been encountering longer and more gentle feelings.

Rates of masturbation have also changed after gender-affirming surgery for both trans women and trans men. A study reported an overall increase of masturbation frequencies in most transsexuals and 78% of them were able to reach orgasm by masturbation after gender-affirming surgery. A study showed that there were differences in masturbation frequency between trans men and trans women; female-to-male individuals masturbated more often than male-to-female. The possible reasons for the difference in masturbation frequency could be associated with the surge of libido, which was caused by the testosterone therapies, or the withdrawal of gender dysphoria.

Concerning trans people's expectations for different aspects of their life, the sexual aspects have the lowest level of satisfaction among all other elements (physical, emotional and social levels). When comparing trans with cisgender persons of the same gender, trans women had a similar sexual satisfaction to cis women, but trans men had a lower level of sexual satisfaction to cis men. Moreover, trans men also had a lower sexual satisfaction with their sexual life than trans women.

== See also ==
- Baptist Medical Center sex reassignment surgery controversy
- Femalia
- Genitoplasty
- LGBTQ health
- Morphological freedom
- O'Donnabhain v. Commissioner
- Sexual and reproductive health
- Transgender health care
- Yogyakarta Principles
