= Vaginectomy =

Surgical removal of the vagina

- ICD-9-CM: 70.4

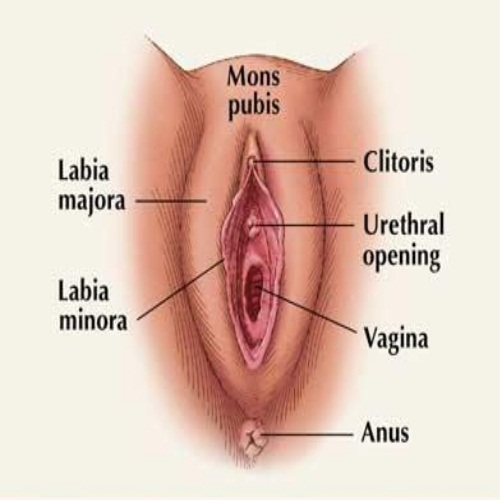
Diagram of a vulva, with the vagina labeled

Vaginectomy is a surgery to remove all or parts of the vagina. It is one form of treatment for individuals with vaginal cancer or rectal cancer that is used to remove tissue with cancerous cells. It can also be used in gender-affirming surgery. Some people born with a vagina who identify as trans men or as nonbinary may choose vaginectomy in conjunction with other surgeries to make the clitoris more penis-like (metoidioplasty), construct of a full-size penis (phalloplasty), or create a relatively smooth, featureless genital area (genital nullification).

If the uterus and ovaries are to remain intact, vaginectomy will leave a canal and opening suitable for draining menstrual discharge. Otherwise, as in genital nullification, a hysterectomy must be performed to avoid the danger of retaining menstrual discharge within the body. In the latter case, thorough removal of vaginal lining is necessary to avoid continued secretion within the body.

In addition to vaginectomy in humans, there have been instances of vaginectomy in other animals to treat vaginal cancer.

== Uses ==
=== Vaginal intraepithelial neoplasia ===
Total or partial vaginectomy along with other procedures like laser vaporization can be used in the treatment of vaginal intraepithelial neoplasia. These procedures remove the cancerous tissue and provide tissue samples to help identify underlying/invasive cancer while maintaining structure and function of the vagina. This surgery along with radiation therapy used to be the optimal treatment for high-grade vaginal intraepithelial neoplasia. However, high rates of recurrence and severe side effects such as vaginal shortening, bleeding and sepsis have narrowed its uses. A partial upper vaginectomy is still the treatment of choice for certain cases of vaginal intraepithelial neoplasia as it has success rates ranging from 69 to 88%.

=== Rectal cancer ===
A vaginectomy is often necessary to remove all cancerous tissue associated with rectal cancer. Depending on the extent of rectal cancer, a total or partial vaginectomy may be indicated to improve long-term survival. Following the surgery and removal of rectal tumors, vaginal and rectal reconstructive surgery can improve healing and may help with self-image and sexual function.

=== Genital gender-affirming surgery ===
Although there has not been a consensus on the standard treatment for penis construction in transgender men, a vaginectomy is a vital step in many of the various techniques. Depending on the reconstructive surgeon and which method is used, the basic outline of the procedure involves taking skin from an area of the body like the forearm or abdomen followed by glans sculpture, vaginectomy, urethral anastomosis, scrotoplasty and finished with a penile prosthesis implantation. The ideal outcome of this procedure, as described by the World Professional Association for Transgender Health (WPATH), is to provide an aesthetically appealing penis that enables sexual intercourse and sensitivity. Complications do arise from this procedure which may include tissue death, urethral complications, and infection.

Radial Forearm Free Flap (RAFFF) is one of the techniques considered for total phallic construction. Developed and performed in 1984, RAFFF consists of three stages and a complete vaginectomy is the second stage of RAFFF. The preferred technique is ablation vaginectomy with simultaneous scrotoplasty, which will close the labia majora along the midline.

=== Recurrent gynecologic malignancies ===
An anterior pelvic exenteration with total vaginectomy (AETV) is a procedure that removes the urinary system (kidneys, ureters, bladder, urethra) as well as the gynecologic system (ovaries, fallopian tubes, uterus, cervix, vagina) and is used as treatment of recurrent gynecologic cancers. A total pelvic exenteration can also be used as treatment which involves the removal of the rectum in addition to the urinary and gynecologic systems. The decision between the two procedures depends on extent of the cancer. Potential benefits of an AETV over a total pelvic exenteration include reduced risk of intestinal injury.

=== Reversal of vaginoplasty ===
Neovaginectomy has been performed to remove the neovagina following vaginoplasty, for instance in transgender women who experience neovaginal complications or those who choose to detransition.

== Contraindications ==
The safety of vaginectomy can depend on individual medical conditions and the subsequent risks they pose. For example, for people with diabetes mellitus, potential contraindications for vaginectomy include wound-healing difficulty; for people who prefer to not undergo hormone therapy, potential contraindications include gonad removal (oophorectomy or orchiectomy).

== Risks/complications ==
Many people who undergo vaginectomy do so for sexual health and intimacy. However, risks of vaginectomy include post-operative sensory issues that range from lack of sensation to excessive sensation, such as hypersensitivity or even pain. To address this, skin grafting is often done with vaginectomy to allow recovery of sexual function.

Other risks may involve consequences of the procedure itself. For example, possible injuries include rectal injury (due to the proximity of the structures), development of a fistula (an abnormal connection between two body parts), or, for people who have phalloplasty done in conjunction with vaginectomy, irritation or even erosion of the skin of the phallus. Some of these locations may be suture sites; irritation of these sites may increase likelihood of infection.

There are pre- and post-operative steps that can be taken to minimize complications from vaginectomy. For example, other procedures that are often performed in conjunction with vaginectomy, such as metoidioplasty and phallourethroplasty, can be performed in two stages to increase the likelihood of a favorable cosmetic outcome. Also, waiting for a period of time after completing a procedure, usually a minimum of 4 months, ensures that the person undergoing the surgery is clear of infections or risk thereof. Thus, procedures towards the end of the gender-affirming process, such as penile prosthesis placement, are usually done separately.

For people with vaginal cancer, vaginectomy can be done partially, instead of radically, depending on the individual person's need as determined by the tumor's size, location, and stage. For example, some people had simple hysterectomy (a procedure that removes a uterus) and then discovered cervical cancer. At this point, upper vaginectomy - along with other suggested procedures such as lymphadenectomy (a procedure that removes lymph nodes) - may be suggested to people who would prefer to keep ovarian function intact. This is an option depending on the invasiveness and severity of the disease and is specifically for individuals with stage I cancer in the upper vagina.

== Techniques ==
Vaginectomy procedures are described by the amount of vaginal tissue removed from an individual which is dependent on the reason for surgery.

=== Removal of cancerous tissue ===
For vaginectomy as a treatment to cancer, tissue is removed in response to the extent of the cancer. A partial vaginectomy removes only the outer most layers of tissue and is performed if the abnormal cells are only found at the skin level. For example, individuals with rectal cancer that has spread to vaginal tissue may undergo a partial vaginectomy in which the posterior wall of the vagina near the anus is removed. A surgeon will make an incision on the abdomen in order to reach the vagina for removal. The operation to remove vaginal tissue will typically happen with at the same time as a colostomy and a abdominoperineal resection in which a portion of the colon is rediverted into a colostomy bag and the rectum is removed. A partial vaginectomy leaves much of the muscles in the vagina intact and can be followed by a vaginal reconstruction surgery.

If more invasive cancer is found, a more complete vaginectomy is performed to remove all cancerous tumors and cells.

=== Gender-affirming surgery ===
In vaginectomy for gender-affirming surgeries, the tissue from the vaginal wall is removed while outer labial flaps are sometimes left in place for other reconstructive surgeries. The procedure gives people who were assigned female sex at birth but do not identify as female, such as transgender men and transmasculine or otherwise nonbinary individuals, genitalia that aids in reducing gender dysphoria and affirming their gender identity through their physical appearance. Counseling is often provided to people considering gender-affirming surgeries prior to procedures in order to limit regret later down the line. In the context of gender-affirming surgery, procedures are categorized as either colpocleisis or total vaginectomy.

Colpocleisis only removes a layer of epithelium or the outer most tissue in the vaginal canal. The walls of the vaginal canal are then sutured shut, but a small channel and the perineum area between the vagina and anus is typically left open to allow for discharge to be emitted from the body. A colpoclesis procedure is sometimes preceded by an oophorectomy and or a hysterectomy to remove the ovaries and uterus which reduces risks of complications from leaving these structures intact and reduces the amount of vaginal discharge. If the ovaries and uterus are left intact there are greater levels of vaginal discharge remain that can contribute to further gender dysphoria in individuals.

Total vaginectomy is becoming the more common form of vaginectomy in gender-affirming surgeries. It involves removal of the full thickness of vaginal wall tissue and can be approached vaginally, as in a transvaginal or transperineal vaginectomy, or abdominally through the area near the stomach, as in an abdominal vaginectomy. In addition to a greater degree of tissue removal, total vaginectomy also involves a more complete closure of the space in the vaginal canal. In comparison to colpocleisis, it is more often preceded by separate oophorectomy and hysterectomy procedures and proceeded by a separate gender reconstruction surgery such as to create a neophallus. Total vaginectomy surgery is sometimes performed using robotic assistance which allows for increased speed and precision for a procedure with less blood loss and a quicker recovery time.

== Recovery ==
Individuals should expect to experience some pain in the first week after the operation. The average hospital stay after operation was a week and all individuals are discharged with a catheter, which is removed after 2–3 weeks. At discharge, individuals learn how to take care of the incisions and must limit their physical activity for the initial 2–3 weeks. Swelling of the abdominal area or abdominal pain are signs of complications during recovery. Some common complications that occur are urethral fistulas and strictures in individuals who undergo vaginectomy and phallic reconstruction for gender-affirming surgeries. This is due to poor blood supply and improper width of the new urethra.

== History ==
Vaginal surgeries have been around throughout medical history. Even before the invention of modern surgical techniques such as anesthesia and sterile tools, there have been many reports of vaginal surgery to treat problems such as prolapse, vaginal fistula, and poor bladder control. For example, the first documented vaginal hysterectomy was performed in 1521 during the Italian Renaissance. Surgical techniques and medical knowledge developed slowly over time until the invention of anesthesia and antisepsis allowed for the age of modern surgery in the mid-nineteenth century. Since then, many techniques and instruments were developed specifically for vaginal surgery like the standardization of sutures in 1937 which greatly improved survival rates by lowering risk of infection. Noble Sproat Heaney developed the "Heaney Stitch" in 1940 to standardize the technique for vaginal hysterectomy. The first documented case of radical vaginal surgery was in February 2003 where a person underwent a radical hysterectomy with vaginectomy and reconstruction.

== Other animals ==
Vaginectomies are also performed outside of the human species. Similarly to humans, animals may also undergo vaginectomies to treat cancer of the vagina. Domesticated animals and pets such as dogs, cats, and horses are more likely to receive a vaginectomy because of its complicated procedure.

=== Dogs ===
Total and partial vaginectomies are not commonly done on dogs as they are complex and are not considered first line therapy however, if other procedures do not work a vaginectomy can be performed on a dog. The most common reasons for a dog to get a vaginectomy include cancer and chronic infection of the vagina. Tumors on the vagina and vulva of the dog accounts for 2.5%-3% of cancers affecting dogs and vaginectomies are one of the treatments to remove and cure the dog. Possible complications from the surgery include loss of bladder control, swelling, and improper skin healing. However, loss of bladder control was fixed spontaneously within 60 days of the operation and the dogs survived at least 100 days with no disease.

== See also ==
- Oophorectomy
- Hysterectomy
- Colpocleisis
- Pelvic exenteration
- List of surgeries by type
