= Prosthetic testicle =

Artificial testicle replacement

A prosthetic testicle is an artificial replacement for a testicle lost through surgery or injury. Consisting of a plastic ovoid manufactured from silicone rubber, and either solid, or filled with a salt solution and implanted in the scrotum, a prosthetic testicle provides the appearance and feel of a testis and prevents scrotum shrinkage. It is also commonly used in female-to-male sex reassignment surgery.

The list shows testicular implants available in the market in 2020.

Product	Company	Country of origin	Type of the implant
Torosa	Coloplast	United States of America	Saline-filled
Testi10SF	Rigicon	United States of America	Saline-filled
Testi10F	Rigicon	United States of America	Firm
Polytech Testicular Implants	Polytech	Germany	Firm

== See also ==
- Prosthesis
- Reconstructive surgery
