= Scrotoplasty =

Type of surgery to create or repair the scrotum

- Other names: Oscheoplasty
- Specialty: Plastic surgery

Human male reproductive system

Scrotoplasty, also known as oscheoplasty, is a type of surgery to create or repair the scrotum. Scientific research for male genital plastic surgery such as scrotoplasty began to develop in the early 1900s. The development of testicular implants began in 1940 made from materials outside of what is used today. Today, testicular implants are created from saline or gel filled silicone rubber. There are a variety of reasons why scrotoplasty is done. Some transgender men and intersex or non-binary people who were assigned female at birth may choose to have this surgery to create a scrotum, as part of their transition. Other reasons for this procedure include addressing issues with the scrotum due to birth defects, aging, or medical conditions such as infection. For newborn males with penoscrotal defects such as webbed penis, a condition in which the penile shaft is attached to the scrotum, scrotoplasty can be performed to restore normal appearance and function. For older male adults, the scrotum may extend with age. Scrotoplasty or scrotal lift can be performed to remove the loose, excess skin. Scrotoplasty can also be performed for males who undergo infection, necrosis, traumatic injury of the scrotum.

== Reasons for getting a scrotoplasty ==
=== Buried penis or penoscrotal webbing ===
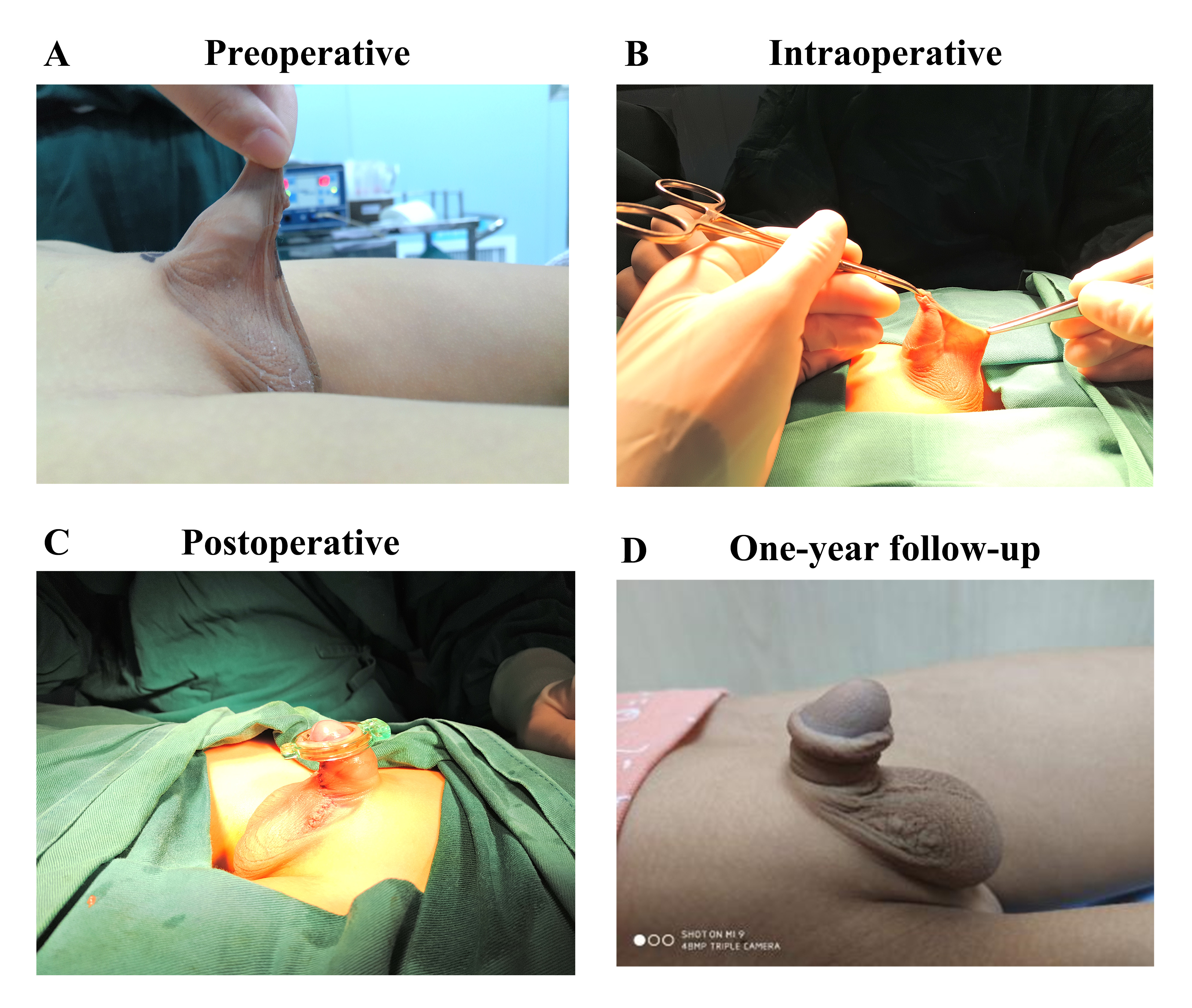
A modified scrotoplasty for penoscrotal webbing in children

Buried penis is a condition when the penis is attached to the scrotum with an excess of skin. This condition can affect both newborn and adult males. Scrotoplasty can be performed to remove the extra skin in the scrotal area and reshape the scrotum. Penoscrotal webbing is another condition, where the skin connecting the penis to the scrotum extends along the underside of the penis shaft like a web. This condition is easily confused with buried penis. Both conditions affect newborn and adult males but they do not always require surgery. Scrotoplasty can be considered to remove excess skin in order to restore normal appearance of the scrotum and penis length, which can improve a man's confidence. In both conditions, the scrotoplasty procedure involves making an incision in the fused part between the penis and scrotum and then reconstructing the scrotum.

=== Female-to-male transition ===
Some trans men and intersex or non-binary people who were assigned female at birth may choose to have gender-affirming surgeries to create male genitals from existing tissue, as part of their female-to-male transition. There are two types of gender-affirming surgeries for the creation of a penis, metoidioplasty and phalloplasty. In both of these surgeries, a scrotoplasty can be considered as an additional surgery to add testicular implants. Metoidioplasty involves modification of the clitoris into a penis. Generally, the clitoris is hormonally enlarged with testosterone, making it possible for it to be straightened and lengthened into a penis. Outcomes of this surgery include the ability to urinate while standing and retain sexual stimulation. Phalloplasty is the other type of surgery to create a penis, but utilizes skin from other areas of the body besides existing genitals. The most common part of the body used in this surgery is the forearm and has the same outcomes as a metoidioplasty. The addition of a scrotoplasty with implants is an optional procedure for individuals to choose based on their goals with their transition. Deciding if a neoscrotum meets their needs in their transition is a consideration for adding a scrotoplasty procedure.

=== Fournier gangrene, trauma and cancer ===
There are various categories of injuries to the scrotum that result in the loss of scrotal skin tissue. Scrotoplasty in these conditions is needed to remove necrotic skin and reconstruct the scrotum. Scrotal skin loss is not common among adult males who require scrotoplasty.

The first category of scrotal injury includes Fournier gangrene, which is a necrotic infection of the soft tissue around the genital. This infection is commonly caused by a poly microbic flora in the individuals who has co-morbidities such as immunocompromised conditions, diabetes mellitus, colorectal infection. To stop the necrotizing fasciitis from spreading, the treatment requires an aggressive surgical debridement which often results in the loss of the scrotal skin. After the patient is stable and cleared from the infection, scrotal reconstruction is needed to restore its function the scrotum.

The second category of scrotal injury includes trauma to the scrotum, such as from burns, machinery accidents, traffic accidents, firearm accidents, and surgical accidents. People who experience these injuries may require scrotoplasty if they lose more than 50% of their skin. Reconstructing scrotal skin can be accomplished by using skin grafts from other areas of the body. Tissue expansion, a procedure in which the skin is stretched to regenerate new cells, can also be an option in order to restore scrotal skin loss. In addition to surgically reconstructing the scrotum, antimicrobial medication and the tetanus vaccine should be given to prevent infection and reduce the risk of developing an infection.

The third category of scrotal injury includes Extramammary Paget cancer that affects the scrotum. If the tissue is affected by cancer, scrotoplasty can be performed to remove the affected skin. However, if the cancer affects the testicles, other surgeries such as removal of the testicles and implantation of testicular prosthetics may be required.

=== Excess skin ===
There are many reasons that can cause scrotal sagging such as natural aging, varicocele, and hydrocele. Naturally, as a person ages, skin loses elasticity and becomes less taut. The scrotum may start to sag due to the loss of elasticity in the skin as well as weakening of the cremaster muscles in the scrotum that pull the testicles toward the body. Many people develop scrotal sagging later in life, but it does not affect everyone. Scrotal sagging may also be due to the swelling of the testicles, a condition known as varicocele, which causes increased blood flow and temperature of the testicles. The body's response is to lower the testicles from the body, which causes sagging. Another reason for scrotal sagging is when the testicles swell and fill with fluid. This condition is known as a hydrocele which is very common among newborn males but can resolve itself within the first year. In adult males, hydrocele has many causes, including inflammation due to injury or infection. Similar to varicocele, the body lowers the testicles, causing scrotal sagging. The specific name for this type of scrotoplasty is commonly known as scrotal lift or scrotal rejuvenation, which is a procedure to remove excess loose scrotal skin, tighten, and reduce the size of the scrotum. Scrotal lift is done not just as a cosmetic surgery to improve the appearance of the scrotum, but also as a way to reduce discomfort. Scrotal sagging can cause discomfort due to chafing of the scrotum against the body during everyday activities and during exercise.

== Procedure ==
=== Pre-operation ===
Candidates must avoid any nicotine products, which can potentially affect wound healings and perioperative complications, for 3 months prior to the surgery. People must also be screened for other contraindications, including obesity with specific adipose distribution. Diabetes can also lead to wound complications such as wound separation or wound disruption. Other contraindications exist for specific types of phalloplasty. For instance, a body mass index (BMI) of greater than 35 kg/m2 is contraindicated for radial forearm free flap (RFFF) phalloplasty. A metoidioplasty or anterolateral thigh (ALT) phalloplasty is only recommended for people with an ideal body weight.

For gender-affirming scrotoplasty, people should have already been receiving hormone therapy for over 1 year with established mental and primary health care. Some transmasculine people have already undergone double mastectomy and hysterectomy. Scrotoplasty for transmasculine individuals is usually done with other gender-related genitourinary surgery (GRGUS), which consists of various procedures with variable personal desires for metoidioplasty, phalloplasty, vaginectomy, and urethroplasty. A comprehensive history and physical assessment of the physical sites are taken during consultation to identify the candidates' surgical goals, which then help determine which procedures are needed.

=== Operation ===
Depending on the purpose of scrotoplasty, whether the patients need to remove excess scrotal skin, reconstruct the scrotum due to scrotal skin loss, or create a new scrotum, the scrotoplasty types will vary.

There are various scrotoplasty techniques for the buried penis and penoscrotal web. The surgeon can perform the simplest technique by making a horizontal incision and closing along the longitudinal axis. However, the methods that give patients higher satisfaction are the single or double Z-plasty or V-Y advancement flap because they also can increase the penile length.

The scrotoplasty procedure requires skin grafting to reconstruct the scrotum for scrotal skin loss. Full-thickness skin grafts (FTSGs) and split-thickness skin grafts STSG are two types of skin graft can be used for reconstruction. The suprapubic skin and the anterior thigh are the most common donor sites.

The novo scrotoplasty is one stage of female-to-male transition, performed together with phalloplasty, which creates the penis. When a trans man or transmasculine person has a scrotoplasty, the labia majora (the big lips of the vulva) are dissected to form hollow cavities and united into an approximation of a scrotal sack. If there is not enough skin to make a scrotum, then the surgeon may need to make tissue expansion before the operation by putting expanders under the skin. Over the course of a few months, more salt water (saline) will be occasionally added to the expanders through a port on the outside. This helps the skin expand and grow more skin. Each expansion procedure is done in an outpatient hospital visit. The patient does not have to stay overnight in the hospital, but will have to stay near the hospital, and return several times.

Most cases of gender-affirming scrotoplasty are done with Hoebeke's technique where the majority of people are satisfied with shape, size, and position of their newly constructed scrotum and consider getting prosthetic testicles and erectile inflatable devices . Initially, a secondary surgery was carried out to insert 2 silicone prosthetic testicles into the newly constructed scrotum between 6–12 months following the initial scrotoplasty. An erectile inflatable device was then implanted during a tertiary surgery at least 12 months from the initial scrotoplasty. Later on, this technique was modified in which 1 silicone prosthetic testicle and an erectile inflatable device were implanted during the same surgery between 6–12 months after the initial scrotoplasty. These can be inserted through small cuts to fill the new scrotum. At this point, the new scrotum no longer needs expanders. Then the skin is closed up around the artificial testicles. The artificial testicles only give a shape and do not create semen, sperm, or hormones.

=== Post-operation ===
In general, post-operative hospital stays for people undergoing scrotoplasty range from days to weeks, corresponding to the complexity of the procedure.

Usually after the procedure, people may wear a support garment to limit the movement of the surgical sites to limit the risk of complications. In addition, a flexible tube for draining urine from the urinary bladder (urinary catheter) is placed and held in place until the genitals heal. Swelling of the scrotal areas is normal and can last up to months.

Individuals with buried penis undergoing a scrotal lift can be discharged on the same day as procedure, and are not allowed to engage in sexual activities for many weeks. People can ambulate or must rest in bed during recovery, depending on the surgeon's decision. A blood thinner (anticoagulant) is considered for people with risk factors for deep vein thrombosis.

== Complications ==
People who are candidates for scrotoplasty need to be educated on the associated risks and complications before the procedure. There have been advancements in the surgical techniques. However, the risk of recurrent condition still exists. In addition, the cosmetic results might not be satisfactory to some people after surgery. Another factor to consider is the loss of sensation in the scrotal area due to the nature of the procedure which can involve removal of genital tissues. These sensation issues occur because the body's nerve tissue requires time to be reestablished with the body. In addition to the loss of sensation, individuals may experience other sensory problems including hypersensitivity and pain. Because of this, issues regarding sex and orgasms may arise post-operation, making it difficult to be sexually satisfied. Once nerve tissue is reestablished with the body after a few months post-operation, sexual function may return to its full capacity.

Complications to scrotoplasty among transmasculine individuals primarily deal with testicular implants. If they are too big, there is chance that the implants could feel uncomfortable, or be a cause of chronic pain. Another complication is that the implant could erode the skin of the scrotum. This can cause infection, or an abnormal connection between two body parts (a fistula) where the implant may work its way outside the body. People with a history of smoking are at increased risk of infections and prosthetic explantation.

Other complications are those that are typical for any surgery, such as blood loss or problems with anesthesia.

== Cost ==
A scrotoplasty for a trans man or transmasculine person typically costs around US$3,000 to $5,000. These costs can be covered by health insurance, though the person receiving care must communicate a great deal with their insurance in order to make certain that it will. In the United States, it is considered illegal for Medicaid, Medicare, and private insurance plans to deny individuals transition-related care coverage. However, individuals may run into issues with their insurance plan coverage because insurance will only cover surgeries that are considered medically necessary. Insurance plans can deny coverage of a scrotoplasty if deemed to be an esthetic or cosmetic surgery instead of a reconstructive one. In this case, all of the costs will be covered by the individual under care.

== See also ==
- Sex reassignment surgery (female-to-male)
- Sex reassignment surgery (male-to-female)
