= Masculinizing surgery =

Gender-affirming surgery for transgender men

Masculinizing gender-affirming surgery for transgender men and transmasculine non-binary people includes a variety of surgical procedures that alter anatomical traits to provide physical traits more aligned to the trans man's identity and desired functioning.

Often used to refer to phalloplasty, metoidoplasty, or vaginectomy, sex reassignment surgery can also more broadly refer to many procedures an individual may have, such as chest reconstruction, hysterectomy, or oophorectomy.

Gender-affirming surgery may be preceded by hormone treatment with testosterone.

== Chest reconstruction ==
Chest reconstruction ("top surgery") can be an important component of transition in the transmasculine population that can substantially improve gender incongruence. This might be done as a step in the process of treating distress due to a difference between experienced or expressed gender and sex assigned at birth (gender dysphoria). The procedure can help transgender men transition physically to their self-affirmed gender. These surgeries have similarities to gynecomastia surgeries for cisgender men, breast reduction surgery for gigantomastia, and the separate mastectomies done for breast cancer. Top surgery involves more than a mastectomy for the treatment of breast cancer. Special techniques are used to contour and reduce the chest wall, position the nipples and areola, and minimize scarring.

If the breast size is small, surgery that spares the skin, nipple and areola may be performed. This procedure minimizes scarring, has a faster healing time and usually preserves sensation in the nipples. During this surgery, incisions are made around the borders of the areolae and the surrounding skin. Breast tissue is removed through the incisions and some skin also might be removed. Remaining skin is reattached at the border of the areola.

Research suggests that most transgender men are satisfied with their surgical results, with only 1% experiencing regret after the operation.

== Hysterectomy and bilateral salpingo-oophorectomy ==
Hysterectomy is a surgical procedure performed to remove the uterus. A total hysterectomy involves removal of the uterus and cervix, and a sub-partial hysterectomy involves removal of only the uterus. Bilateral salpingo-oophorectomy (BSO) is the removal of both ovaries and fallopian tubes.

Hysterectomy can be performed through three methods: abdominal, laparoscopic, vaginal. Abdominal hysterectomy is performed with incision into the abdominal wall, whereas laparoscopic and vaginal hysterectomies are minimally invasive procedures. Current ACOG guidelines recommend minimally invasive procedures, specifically vaginal hysterectomy, over surgical hysterectomy due to faster recovery time, shorter procedural time, shorter hospital stays and better quality of life. Discharge from minimally invasive hysterectomy can occur as fast as one day post-operation, in contrast to five days post-operation for abdominal hysterectomies. Following discharge, patients often experience gastrointestinal symptoms such as constipation or urinary tract infections, as well as vaginal bleeding or discharge. These symptoms should be temporary and resolve within six weeks. Follow-up visits with a gynecologist is recommended six-weeks following hysterectomy.

Follow-up care for transmasculine patients with a uterus includes seeing a gynecologist for a check-up at least every three years. This is particularly the case for patients who:

- retain their vagina (whether before or after further genital reconstruction)
- have a strong family history of cancers of the breast, ovary, or uterus (endometrium)
- have a personal history of gynecological cancer or significant dysplasia on a Pap smear
- develop vaginal bleeding post-operation and hormone therapy

Complications of hysterectomy involve infection, venous thromboembolic events, genitourinary and gastrointestinal tract injury and nerve injury. The most common of these complications is infection, which occurs at a rate of 10.5% of abdominal hysterectomy, 13% of vaginal hysterectomy and 9% of laparoscopic hysterectomy. There is also a low risk of long-term complications, which can include chronic pain, sexual dysfunction and bowel dysfunction.

== Genital surgery ==
Also known as genital reconstructive procedures (GRT).

=== Phalloplasty ===
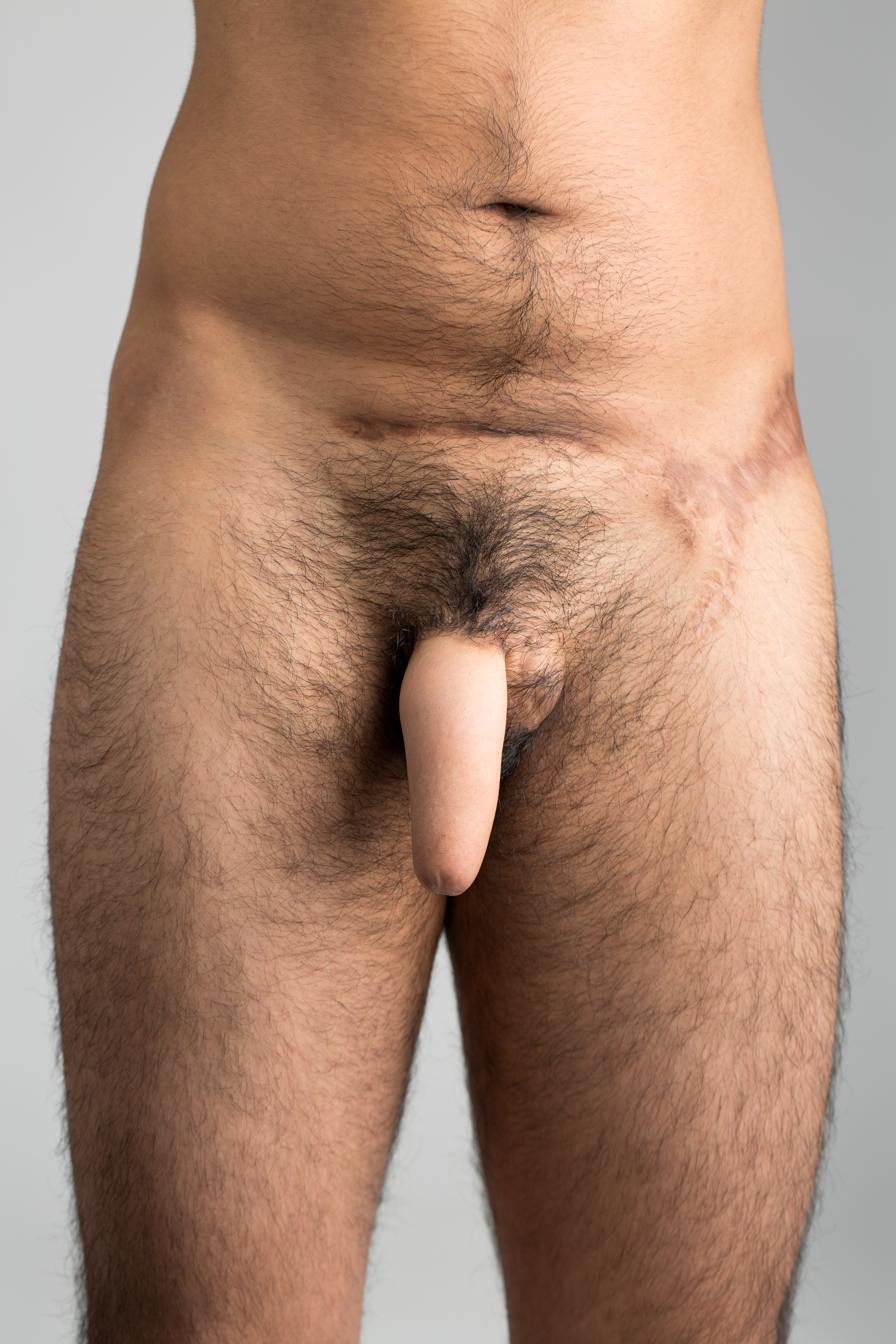
Example of stage 1 female-to-male sex reassignment prior to glansplasty penis with tissue grafting scar on the left hip

Phalloplasty is the process of constructing a penis using a flap (graft) from the patient's arm, thigh, abdomen, or back. Compared to metoidioplasty, phalloplasty provides a larger penis which may more closely resemble a natal penis. A neophallus created through phalloplasty relies on penile implants to achieve erection. Sexual sensation varies in location and intensity, but is usually preserved at least at base of the penis, where the original clitoris was.

=== Metoidioplasty ===
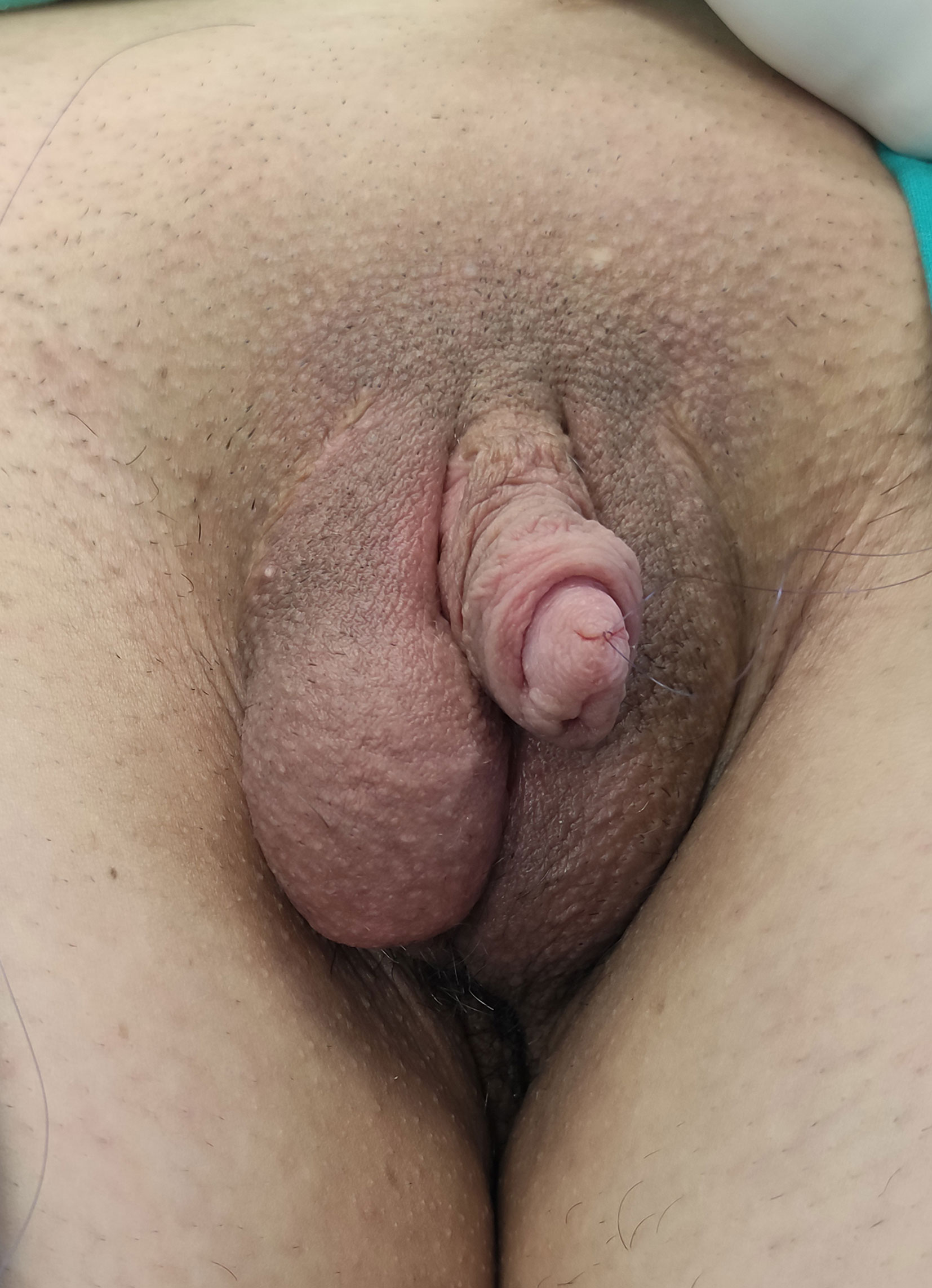
Example of completed metoidioplasty including neourethra and scrotoplasty, two years post-operation.

Metoidioplasty is done after enlarging the clitoris using hormone replacement therapy, where a neophallus is constructed from the enlarged clitoris, with or without extending the urethra to allow urination while standing up. The labia majora are united to form a scrotum, where prosthetic testicles can be inserted. The new neophallus ranges in size from 4–10 cm (with an average of 5.7 cm) and has the approximate girth of a human adult thumb. Sexual sensation and erectile function are usually completely preserved. Specialized metoidioplasty penile implants may be an option in those who cannot achieve penetration during sex.

=== Penile implants ===
Penile implants are usually used in phalloplasty surgery due to the inability of the neophallus to achieve proper erection. The penile implants are used in cisgender men to treat erectile dysfunction, and in transgender men during female-to-male sex reassignment surgery. Although the same penile implant has been used for both cisgender and transgender men, specialized penile implants for transgender men were recently developed by Zephyr Surgical Implants (Switzerland), in both inflatable and malleable models. During phalloplasty, the tissue flap used to build the neophallus is wrapped around the implant either in the same surgery, or in separate surgeries. Penile implants are less commonly used in metoidioplasty due to how the process is done.

== Facial masculinization ==
Facial masculinization also alters anatomical features to achieve an appearance that aligns more closely with gender identity. This can be achieved surgically, which might entail reconstruction of the forehead, nose, upper lip, or chin. Non-surgical options include injections to alter the jawline and chin. Non-surgical methods can be combined with surgery or used alone when subtle changes are desired. In addition to alteration of facial structure, hair transplantation can be used to achieve more permanent masculine hair growth patterns such as sideburns, mustaches, or beards.

== See also ==
- Facial masculinization surgery, plastic surgery changing one's face to masculine morphology
- Feminizing surgery, feminizing surgery for transgender women
- List of transgender-related topics
- Penile implant, a medical device

== Notes and references ==
=== General sources ===
- Factors Which Influence Individual's Decisions When Considering Female-To-Male Genital Reconstructive Surgery by Katherine Rachlin from the International Journal of Transgenderism. Female-To-Male Genital Reconstructive Surgery. Factors, Benefits and Risks by Preecha Tiewtranon This article also discusses some general issues of female-to-male GRT.
