= Phalloplasty =

Operation to construct or reconstruct a penis

- Specialty: Urology
- ICD-10-PCS: 0VUS07
- CPT: 54304

Phalloplasty (also called penoplasty) is the construction or reconstruction of a penis or the artificial modification of the penis by surgery. The term is also occasionally used to refer to penis enlargement.

== History ==
Russian surgeon Nikolaj Bogoraz performed the first reconstruction of a total penis using rib cartilage in a reconstructed phallus made from a tubed abdominal flap in 1936. The first gender-affirming surgery for a trans man was performed in 1946 by Sir Harold Gillies on fellow physician Michael Dillon, documented in Pagan Kennedy's book The First Man-Made Man. Gillies' technique remained the standard one for decades. Later improvements in microsurgery made more techniques available.

F. Brantley Scott's 1973 inflatable penile prosthesis model—originally intended for cisgender men with erectile impotence and urinary incontinence—served as a precursor to the full phalloplasty, first performed as gender-affirming care in 1977 by Charles L. Puckett and Joseph E. Montie. In the same year, The New York Times newsletter reported on this under the title of "2 Missouri U. Surgeons Report a Medical First In Transsexual Operation". This article was followed by one from The Times; titled "Transsexual 'First'". A quote from the latter:

Two surgeons at the University of Missouri reported last April that they had performed the first female-to-male transsexual operation in which the patient was given a penis capable of erection. The doctors said the penis contained a tiny hydraulic system that permitted a fluid to be pumped from a reservoir in the abdomen into the penis to cause erection. Investigation shows that the penis-erection device has been used in more than 200 operations in the country to date, most performed by the device's inventor, Dr. F. Brantley Scott, a urologist affiliated with the Baylor College of Medicine in Houston. (...) As for the Missouri transsexual, informants describe him as an "extremely intelligent" student of bacteriology at the University of Missouri. Dr. Joseph Montie, the urologist who did the surgery with Dr. Charles Puckett, a plastic surgeon, says he keeps in touch with the patient. "I've seen him around town several times," Dr. Montie says, "and he always seems to be with reasonably attractive young ladies. What can I say? It looks like he's doing fine. The thing is working well. We're very pleased with how it's working."
—Richard Haitch

== Indications ==
A complete construction or reconstruction of a penis can be performed on patients who:

- Have congenital anomalies such as micropenis, epispadias, and hypospadias
- Have lost their penis
- Desire gender-affirming surgery as part of their gender transition.

== Techniques and related procedures ==
There are different techniques for phalloplasty. Construction of a new penis (sometimes called a neophallus or neopenis) typically involves taking a tissue flap from a donor site (such as the forearm). Extending the urethra through the length of the neophallus is often another goal of phalloplasty. For gender-affirming surgeries that include urethral lengthening, vaginectomy is recommended due to the reduction in complication rate, but not required.

Temporary lengthening can also be gained by a procedure that releases the suspensory ligament where it is attached to the pubic bone, thereby allowing the penis to be advanced toward the outside of the body. The procedure is performed through a discreet horizontal incision located in the pubic region where the pubic hair will help conceal the incision site. However, scar formation can cause the penis to retract. Therefore, the American Urological Association "considers the division of the suspensory ligament of the penis for increasing penile length in adults to be a procedure which has not been shown to be safe or efficacious."

== Penile implants ==
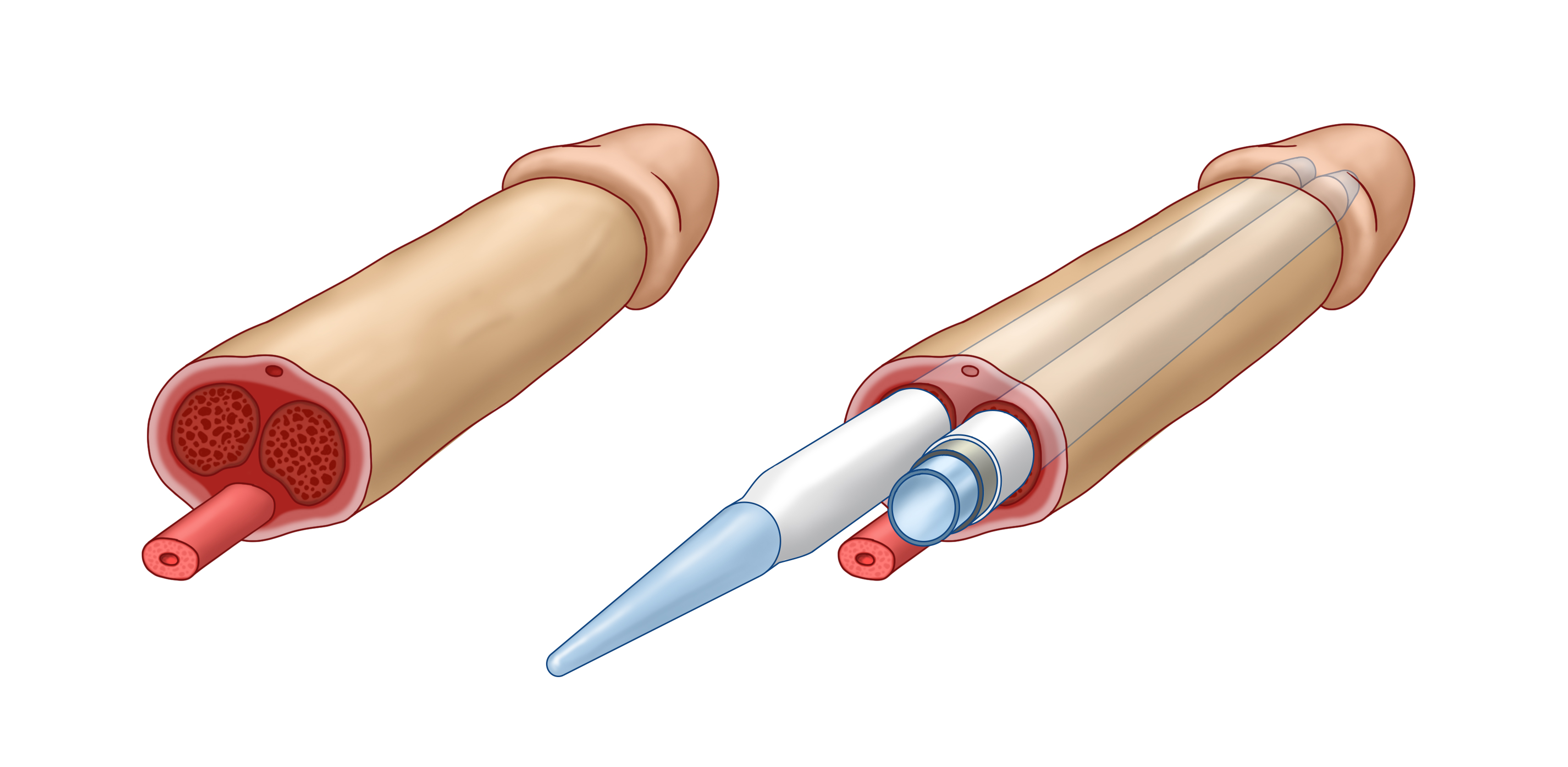
An inflatable penile implant inserted into corpus cavernosum of the penis

Phalloplasty requires an implanted penile prosthesis to achieve an erection. Penile prostheses are implanted devices intended to restore the erectile rigidity in cisgender men and to build a neophallus (new penis) in transgender men. Penile implants have been used in phalloplasty surgeries both in cisgender and transgender patients since 1970s.

There are two main types of penile implants – malleable (also known as non-inflatable or semi-rigid) and inflatable implants. Both types have a pair of cylinders implanted into the penis, replacing the corpus cavernosum in cisgender men and serving as the core for the neophallus in the phalloplasty procedure. The cylinder of the inflatable implant is filled with sterile saline solution. Pumping saline into the chambers of this cylinder produces an erection. The glans of the penis, however, remains unaffected.

In gender-affirming or penile reconstruction surgeries, a new penis can be formed with the use of a penile implant surrounded with a tissue flap.

The pump unit of inflatable penile implants resembles a human testicle and can serve as an artificial testicle for concomitant scrotoplasty. For gender-affirming surgeries, if no scrotoplasty was performed the pump unit can be placed within the existing labia.

Initially, penile implants were used in phalloplasty procedures. However, since there is no corpus cavernosum in the penis undergoing phalloplasty, and the fact that standard penile implants were designed to be implanted in corpus cavernosum, there were many adverse outcomes. Since 2015, Zephyr Surgical Implants offers malleable and inflatable penile implants particularly designed for phalloplasty surgeries. Implantation procedures are usually done in a separate surgery to allow time for proper healing.

== Explanation of techniques ==
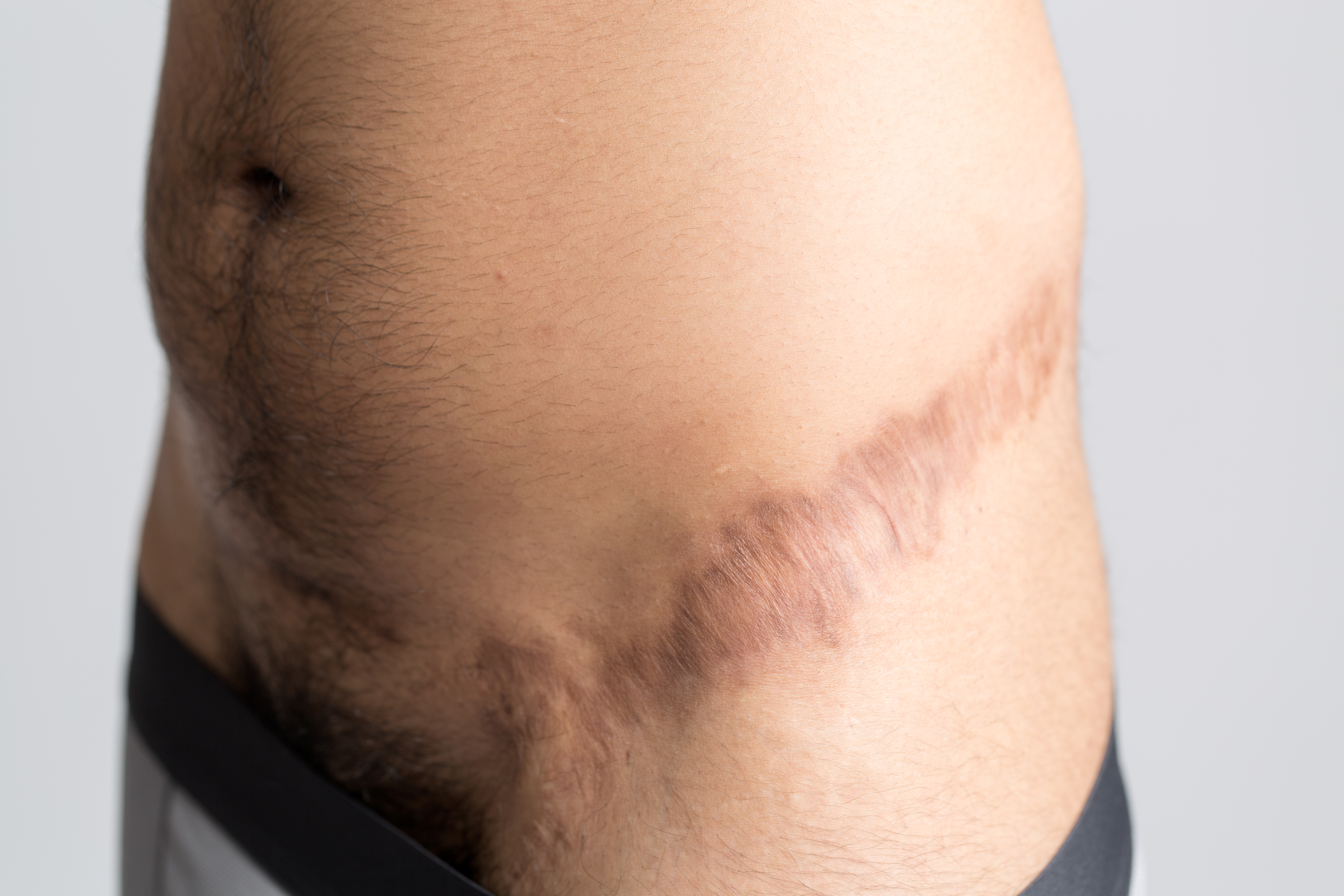
Hip showing scar from superficial circumflex iliac artery perforator skin graft used for phalloplasty.

=== Radial forearm flap ===
Radial forearm flap, also referred to as RFF, uses a free flap from the forearm to create a neophallus. Existing clitoral tissue may be buried at the base of the neophallus or left exposed. Hair removal on a portion of the donor site is required for urethral lengthening and a split thickness graft is taken from the thigh to cover the graft site on the forearm. Nerves from the flap and the tissue it has been attached to can be connected via microsurgery and sensation outcomes are positive for the majority of patients.

=== Anterolateral thigh flap ===
Anterolateral thigh flap, also referred to as ALT, uses a graft from the thigh to form the neophallus. It can be done as a free flap procedure, as a pedicled flap, or as a delayed flap where the non-main blood supply is severed prior to the surgery to give the tissue time to adapt to the new blood supply. Sensation outcomes for nerve hook up have been found to be equivalent to RFF. The resulting scarring is easier to conceal than RFF due to the location on the upper thigh. Depending on the thickness of the individual's skin and the amount of sub-cutaneous fat present, the neophallus may require debulking procedures to remove excess girth.

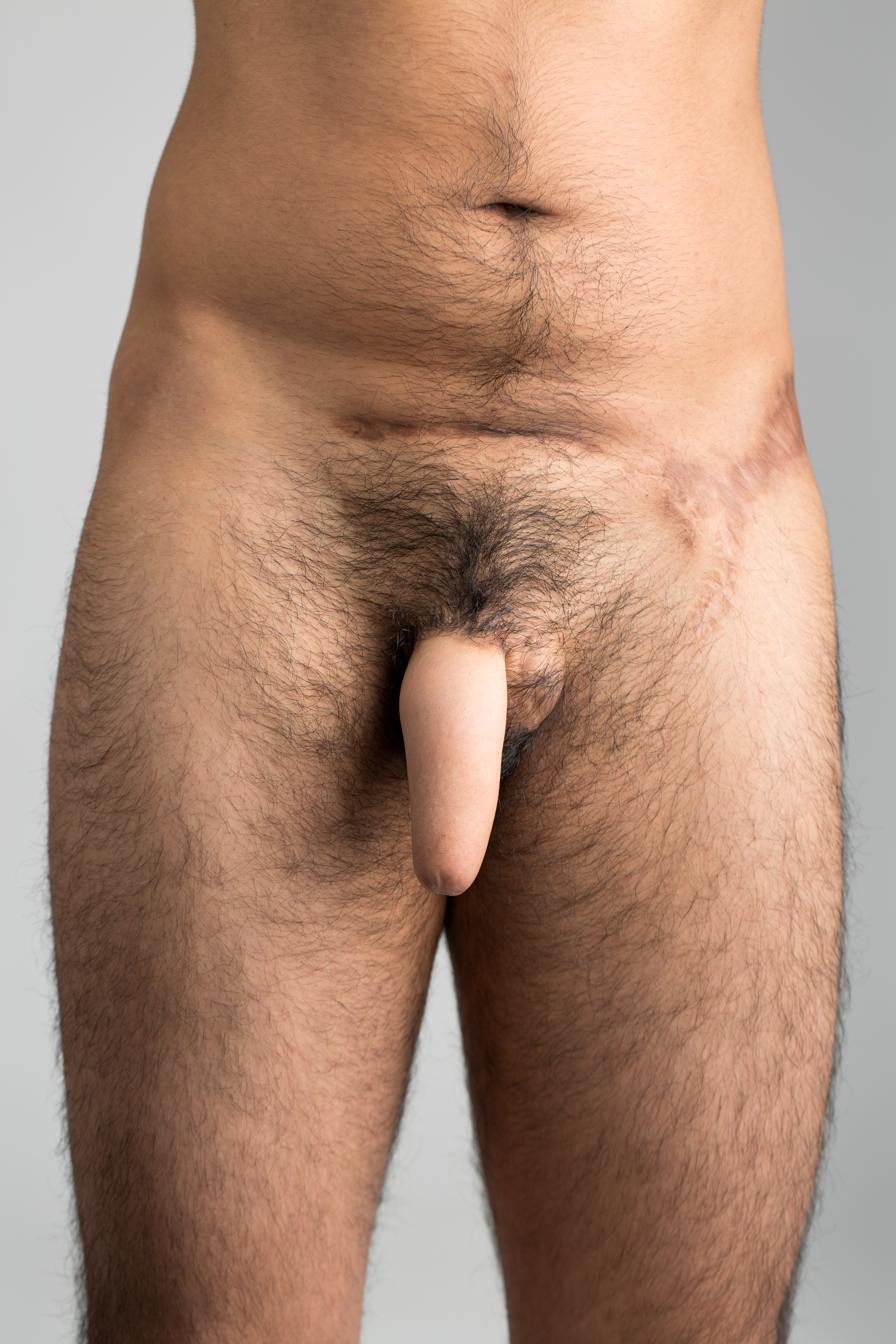
Example of stage 1 female-to-male sex reassignment prior to glansplasty penis with tissue grafting scar on the left hip

=== Musculocutaneous latissimus dorsi flap ===
This phalloplasty method uses a flap from the latissimus dorsi muscle. The technique is also referred to as MLD. The nerve harvested from this location is a motor nerve, which provides less tactile sensation than RFF or ALT techniques, though erogenous sensation is still present from the existing clitoral tissue. The resulting scar is much thinner than RFF or ALT, forming a Y shape starting beneath the arm and extending down the side of the torso. The donor site often requires little to no hair removal.

=== Abdominal flap ===
Abdominal phalloplasty, or supra-pubic phalloplasty, makes use of a graft from the abdomen. The first recorded gender-affirming phalloplasty by Sir Harold Gillies utilized an abdominal flap to create a tube-in-tube neophallus. If nerve hook up or urethral lengthening are desired, a graft can be harvested from a small section of the forearm similar to RFF. Scarring is thin and easily hidden beneath clothing and hair removal of the graft site is not required, though it may still be pursued for aesthetic purposes.

=== Superficial circumflex iliac artery perforator flap ===
This technique takes a graft from either side of the hip and is also called a SCIP or SCIA flap. It is often used for shaft-only phallus creation without urethral lengthening, or to form the urethra for a composite graft site technique. It is a more recent graft site first described in 2004 by Koshima and the scar is relatively easy to hide with its placement on the hip.

=== Thoracodorsal artery perforator flap ===
This flap is taken from the side of the chest and is also referred to as a TdAP flap. It can be used for shaft-only phalloplasty without urethral lengthening. The placement and size of the scar makes it easily hidden compared to some other graft sites, and it can allow for larger phallus sizes.

=== Subcutaneous soft silicone implant ===
This phalloplasty procedure involves the insertion of a subcutaneous soft silicone implant under the penile skin.

=== No-touch surgical technique ===
The no-touch surgical technique for penile prosthesis implantation is a surgical procedure developed by J. Francois Eid for the implantation of a penile implant. Implantation through the use of the "No-Touch" technique minimizes the risk of infection.

As advancements in the design and manufacturing process of the IPP improved its mechanical survival, infection has emerged as the leading cause of implant failure. Although relatively infrequent (varying from .06% to 8.9%) infection of a penile prosthesis results in serious medical consequences for patients, requiring complete removal of the device and permanent loss of penile size and anatomy. Bacterial contamination of the device can occur during the surgery, and is caused by allowing direct or indirect contact of the prosthesis with the patient's skin. Over 70% of infections occur due to the skin microbiome's microorganisms including Staphylococcus epidermidis, Staphylococcus aureus, Streptococcus and Candida albicans.

Traditional strategies to combat infections aim at decreasing skin colony count such as scrubbing skin preparation with alcohol and chlorhexidine or kill bacteria once the implant is contaminated by skin flora such as intravenous antibiotics, antibiotic irrigation and antibiotic-coated implants. The "No-Touch" technique is unique in that it aims to prevent bacterial contamination of the prosthesis by completely eliminating contact of the device with the skin.

Paired with the antibiotic-coated implant, the "No Touch" technique decreases infection to a rate of 0.46%, opposing the traditional method which has an infection rate of 5%. The use of an antibiotic-coated implant and a no-touch surgical technique with skin preparation measures and peri-operative antibiotic use has been found to be of high importance in the prevention of infection among penile implants. Eid developed the technique in 2006 on the hypothesis that eliminating any contact between the prosthesis and the skin, either directly or indirectly via surgical instruments or gloves, should reduce the incidence of contamination of the device with skin flora responsible for infection.

==== Procedure ====
Three days prior to the procedure, a patient is placed on oral fluoroquinolones, a grouping of antibacterial drugs. During this time, the patient scrubs the lower abdomen and genitals daily with chlorhexidine soap. On the day of the surgery, vancomycin and gentamicin are administered intravenously one to two hours prior to the procedure. The lower abdomen and genitals are shaved, scrubbed for five minutes with a chlorhexidine sponge and prepped with chorhexidine/alcohol applicator. The area is then draped with a surgical drape and a Vi Drape over the genitalia. Before the incision is made, a Foley catheter is inserted in the bladder through the urethra.

A 3 cm (1.2 in) scrotal incision is made on the penoscrotal raphe and carried down through the subcutaneous tissue to the Buck's fascia. A Scott retractor, a flexible device that holds open the skin of the surgical site, is applied to the area.

Up until this stage of the surgery, the process has been consistent with the sanitary practices associated with standard surgical sterility. At this stage of the "No-Touch" technique, after the incision has been made, all instruments, including surgical gloves, that have touched skin are discarded. A loose drape is then deployed over the entire surgical field and secured at the periphery with adhesive strips. A small opening in the drape is then made overlying the incision and yellow hooks utilized to secure the edges of the opening to the edges of the incision, completely covering and isolating the patient's skin. At this point, new instruments and equipment are replaced and the entire prosthesis is inserted through the small opening of the loose drape. The loose drape allows for manipulation of the penis and scrotum required for this procedure without touching the skin.

Implantation of the device continues with an incision and dilation of corpora, sizing and placing the penile cylinders, and placement of the pump in the scrotum and the reservoir in the retropubic space. Saline is used throughout the implantation for irrigation. Once the corporotomies are closed and all of the tubing and components of the prosthesis covered with a layer of Buck's fascia, subcutaneous tissues are closed and the "No-Touch" drape is removed and the skin closed.

=== Future ===
Penis transplantation could also become a standardized method.

== See also ==
- List of transgender-related topics
- Metoidioplasty
- Penis enlargement
- Penis transplantation
- Sex reassignment surgery

== Sources ==
- Total Phalloplasty Using a Musculocutaneous Latissimus Dorsi Flap by Sava V. Perovic, Rados Djinovic (British Journal of Urology, Reconstructive Urology, Volume 100 Issue 4, Sep 2007)
- New Technique of Total Phalloplasty With Reinnervated Latissimus Dorsi Myocutaneous Free Flap in Female-to-Male Transsexuals by Vesely, Jiri; Hyza, Petr; Ranno, Raul; Cigna, Emanuele; Monni, Nicola; al etc. (Annals of Plastic Surgery, Volume 58 Issue 5, May 2007)
- Simultaneous Penis and Perineum Reconstruction Using a Combined Latissimus Dorsi-Scapular Free Flap with Intraoperative Penile Skin Expansion by Rohrich, Rod J.; Allen, Terry; Lester, Fred; Young, Jonathan P.; Katz, Scott L. (Journal of Plastic and Reconstructive Surgery, Volume 99 Issue 4, April 1997)
- Neophalloplasty in Female-to-Male Transsexuals with the Island Tensor Fasciae Latae Flap by Santanelli, Fabio M.D., Ph.D.; Scuderi, Nicolò (Journal of Plastic and Reconstructive Surgery, Volume 105 Issue 6, May 2000)
- A New Surgical Procedure for Phallic Reconstruction: Istanbul Flap by Mutaf, Mehmet (Journal of Plastic and Reconstructive Surgery, Volume 105 Issue 4, April 2000)
- One-Stage Reconstruction of the Penis with Composite Iliac Crest and Lateral Groin Skin Flap by Sun, Guang-ci M.D.; Huang, Jin-jing (Annals of Plastic Surgery, Volume 15 Issue 6, December 1985)
- A Novel Single-Flap Technique for Total Penile Reconstruction: The Pedicled Anterolateral Thigh Flap by Lee, Gordon K.; Lim, Angeline F.; Bird, Erin (Journal of Plastic and Reconstructive Surgery, Volume 124 Issue 1, July 2009)
- Penile Reconstruction by the Free Scapular Flap and Malleable Penis Prosthesis by Yang, Mingyong; Zhao, Muxin; Li, Senkai; Li, Yangqun (Journal of Plastic and Reconstructive Surgery, Volume 59 Issue 1, July 2007)
- Hage, J. Joris (1992). Peniplastica Totalis to Reassignment Surgery of the External Genitalia in Female-to-Male Transsexuals. VU University Press. ISBN 978-90-5383-115-1.
- Long-Term Follow-Up of Total Penile Reconstruction with Sensate Osteocutaneous Free Fibula Flap in 18 Biological Male Patients by Sengezer, Mustafa; Öztürk, Serdar; Deveci, Mustafa; Odabasi, Zeki (Journal of Plastic and Reconstructive Surgery, Volume 114 Issue 2, August 2004)
- Long-Term Fate of the Bony Component in Neophallus Construction with Free Osteofasciocutaneous Forearm or Fibula Flap in 18 Female-to-Male Transsexuals by Papadopulos, Nikolaos A.; Schaff, Juergen; Biemer, Edgar (Journal of Plastic and Reconstructive Surgery, Volume 109 Issue 3, March 2002)
- Use of forearm free-flap phalloplasty in bladder exstrophy adults by Marc-Olivier Timsit, Pierre Mouriquand, Alain Ruffion, Alain Bouillot, Diala Dembelé, Arnaud Mejean, Fanny Lalloue, Albert Leriche and Nicolas Morel-Journel (BJU International, Volume 103 Issue 10, Dec 2008)
- Phalloplasty for female transsexuals with sensate free forearm flap by Rong-Hwang Fang, Jin-Teh Lin, Shiuh Ma (Microsurgery, Volume 15 Issue 5, Oct 2005)
- Long-term outcome of forearm flee-flap phalloplasty in the treatment of transsexualism by Albert Leriche, Marc-Olivier Timsit, Nicolas Morel-Journel, André Bouillot, Diala Dembele and Alain Ruffion (BJU International, Volume 101 Issue 10, Jan 2008)
- Penile Reconstruction: Is the Radial Forearm Flap Really the Standard Technique? by Monstrey, Stan; Hoebeke, Piet; Selvaggi, Gennaro; al etc. (Journal of Plastic and Reconstructive Surgery, Volume 124 Issue 2, August 2009)
- Addressing the ideal requirements by free flap phalloplasty: Some reflections on refinements of technique by J. Joris Hage, Floris H. De Graaf (Microsurgery, Volume 14 Issue 9, Oct 2005)
- Total Phallic Construction in Female to Male Transsexuals by Giulio Garaffa, Nim A. Christopher, David J. Ralph (Current Urology, Vol. 3, No. 3, 2009)
- Gender Reassigment by Dan Greenwald and Wayne Stadelmann (eMedicine Journal, Volume 2 Number 7, 6 July 2001)
- Gender Identity Disorders: Diagnostic and Surgical Aspects by Michael Sohn, and Hartmut Bosinski, MD (Journal of Sexual Medicine, Volume 4 Issue 5, Aug 2007)
- Glans sculpting in phalloplasty — experiences in female-to-male transsexuals by Rong-Hwang Fang, Yi-Sheng Kaoa, Shiuh Ma, Jin-Teh Lin (Journal of Plastic, Reconstructive & Aesthetic Surgery, Volume 51, Issue 5, July 1998)
- Severe Penile Injuries: Etiology, Management and Outcomes by Sava V. Perovic, Urologia Polska (Polish Journal of Urology) 2005/58/3, ISSN 0500-7208.
