= Feminizing surgery =

Feminizing surgery for transgender women

Feminizing gender-affirming surgery for transgender women and transfeminine people or transfeminine non-binary people describes a variety of surgical procedures that alter the body to provide physical traits more comfortable and affirming to an individual's gender identity and overall functioning.

Often used to refer to vaginoplasty, sex reassignment surgery can also more broadly refer to other gender-affirming procedures an individual may have, such as permanent reduction or removal of body or facial hair through laser hair removal or electrolysis, facial feminization surgery, tracheal shave, vulvoplasty, orchiectomy, voice surgery, or breast augmentation. Sex reassignment surgery is usually preceded by beginning feminizing hormone therapy. Some surgeries can reduce the need for hormone therapy.

Interest in the possibility of gender-affirming surgeries for transgender women has been reported since Antiquity, though the first successful surgery was performed in the 20th century. Most patients report greater quality of life and sexual health outcomes postoperatively.

== Genital surgery ==
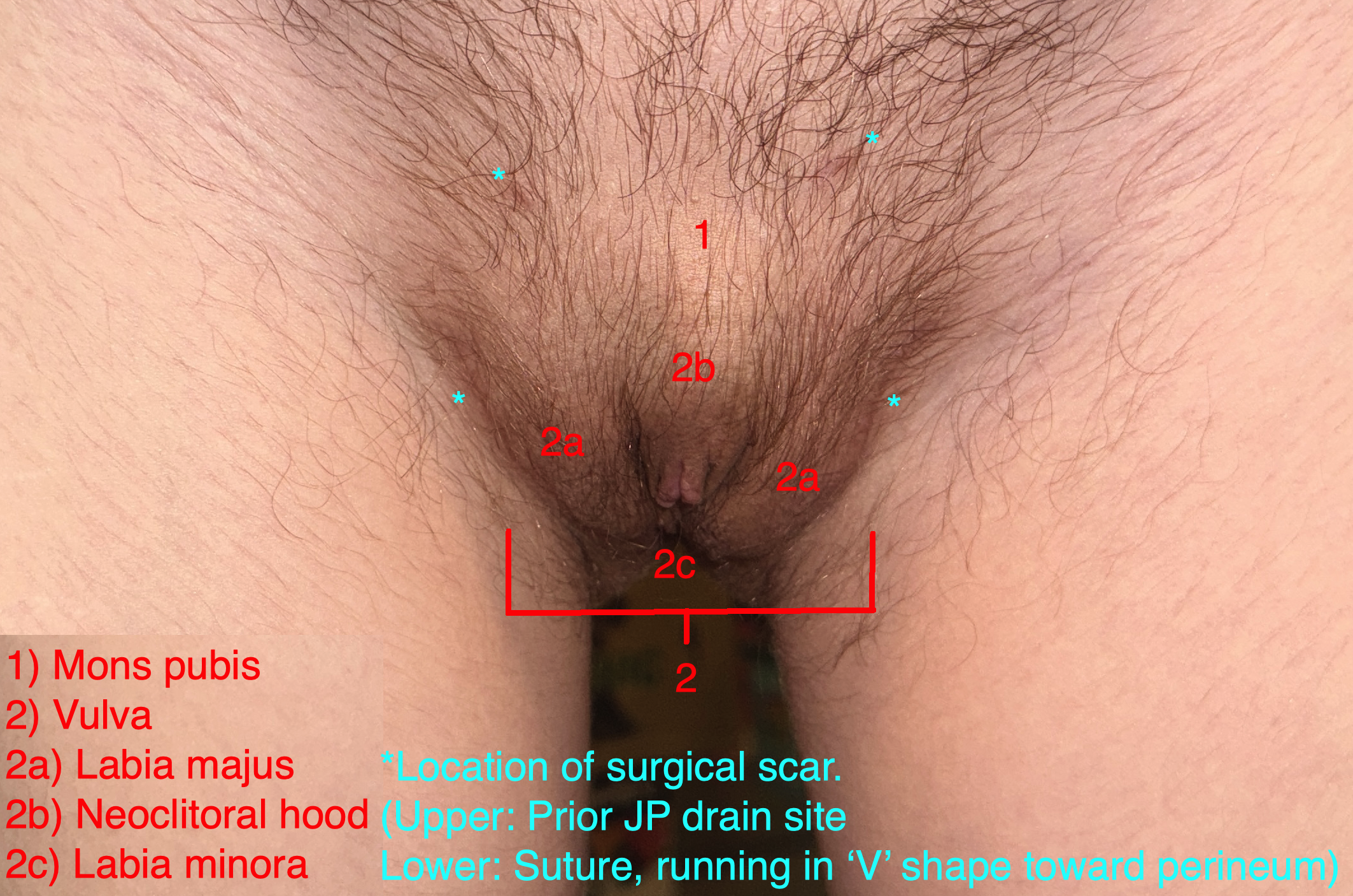
The results of a penile inversion vaginoplasty, six months after surgery

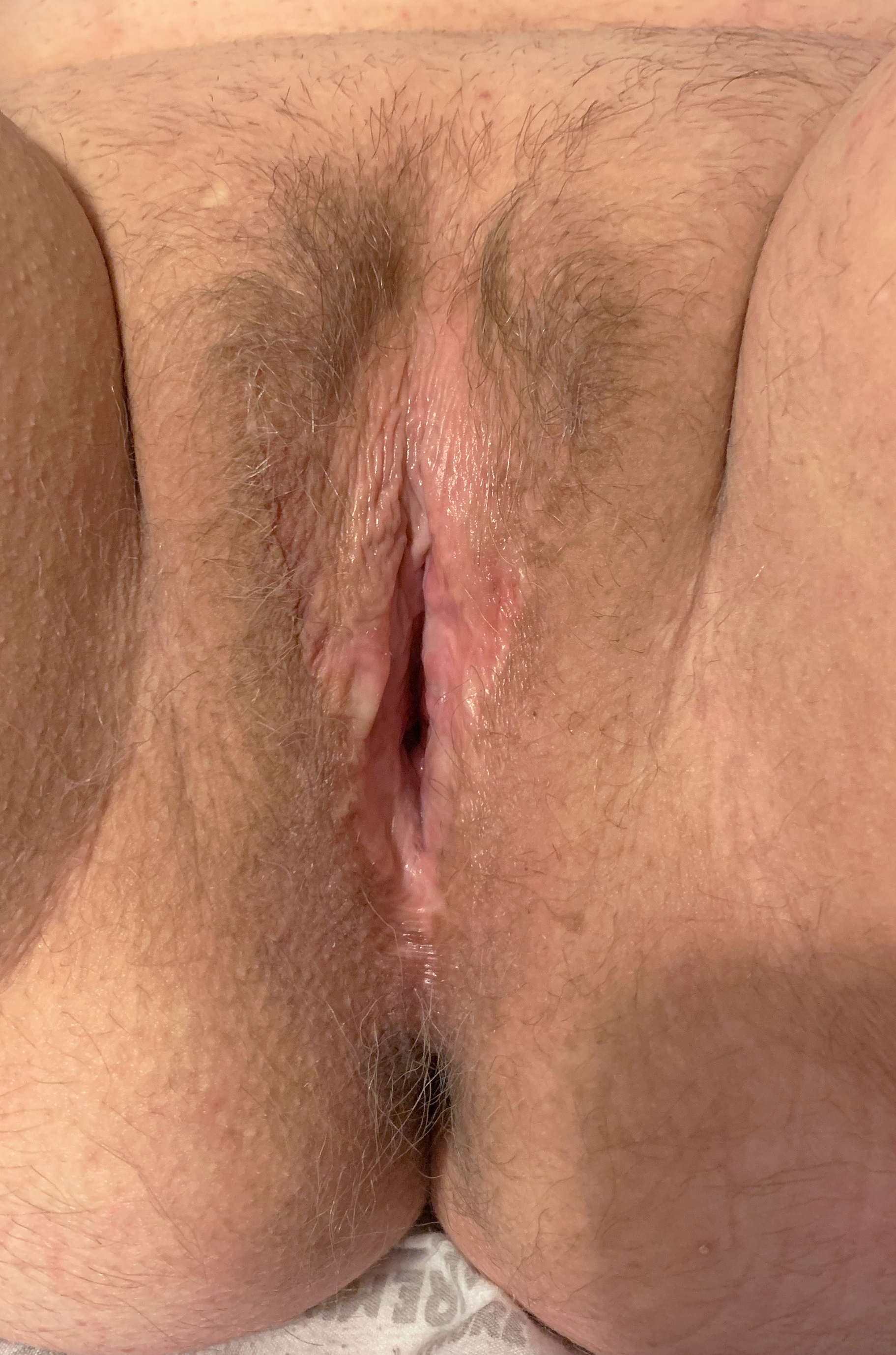
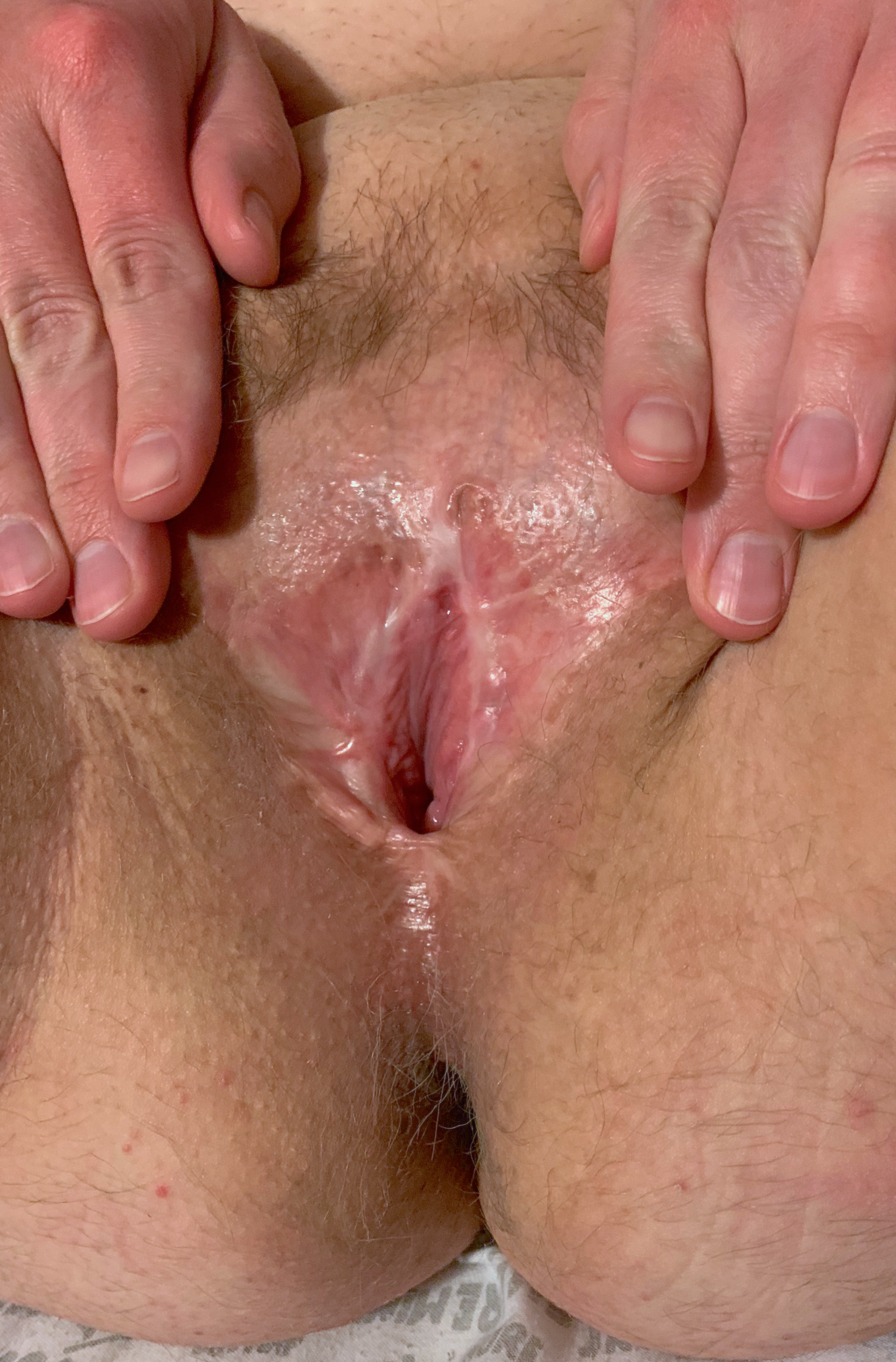
The results of a penile inversion vaginoplasty, two years after surgery. Inner labia vary aesthetically based on surgeon; here, they are very minimal. The clitoris is tactile rather than visual, another aesthetic difference by surgeon. A faded surgical scar comes up from the perineum and follows the outer labia in a curved shape.

There are a variety of genital surgeries available to trans women and transfeminine non-binary people. Genital surgery can be an effective way for an individual to ease or eliminate feelings of disconnection or discomfort with their natal genitals; for others, including those who do not feel strongly about their natal genitals, it can create feelings of connection or congruence with their genitals post-surgery. Following the removal of the testicles, the human body produces very little testosterone. This can improve the results of supplemental estrogen medication and eliminates the need to take antiandrogen medication.

=== Vaginoplasty ===
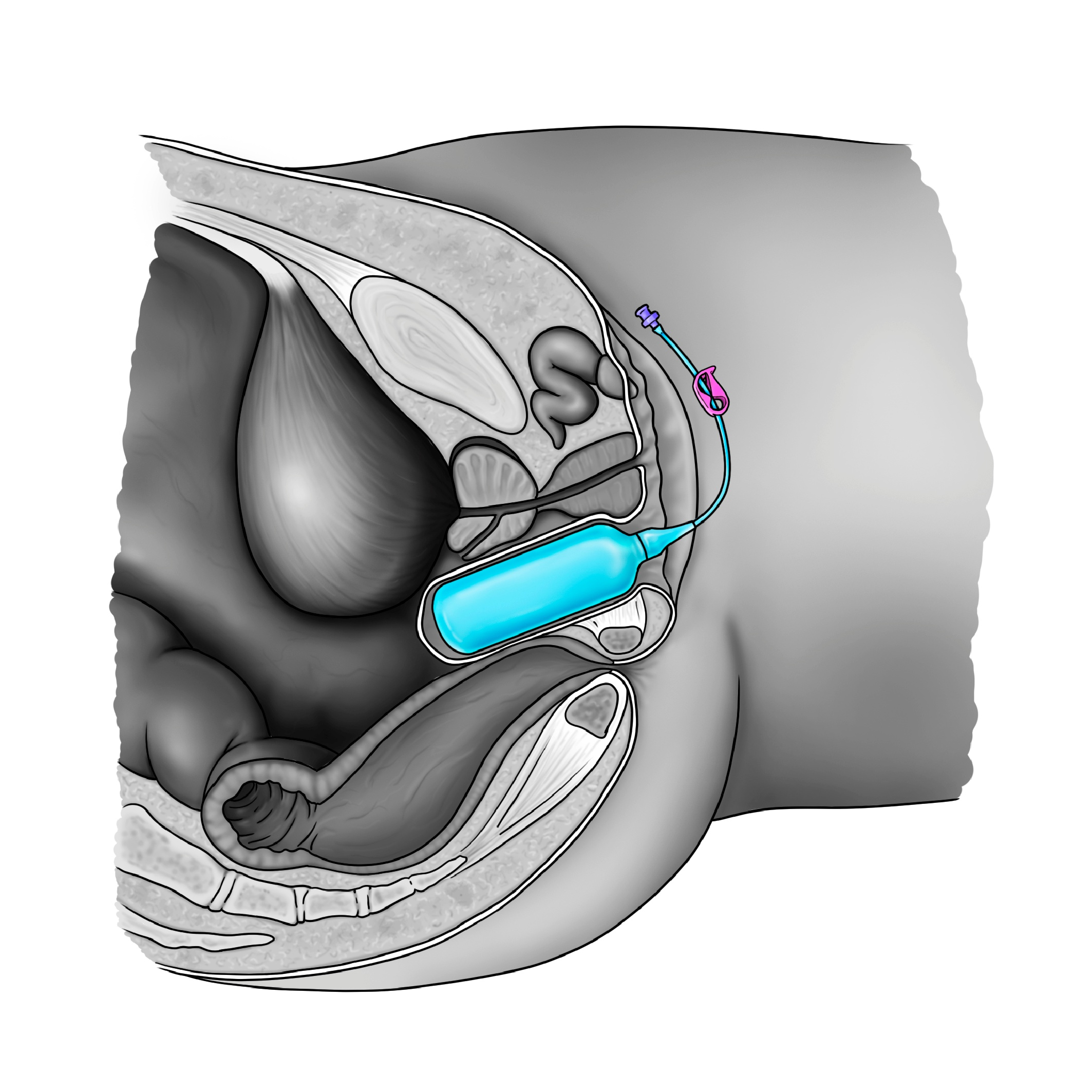
Side view of a vaginal dilator placed in a neovagina after vaginoplasty

Vaginoplasty is the process of constructing a neovagina and neovulva from existing genital or abdominal tissue. There are multiple techniques for performing vaginoplasty. Sexual sensation is typically retained following surgery, and the self-reported rate of personal satisfaction with surgical results across different vaginoplasty techniques is very high.

==== Penile inversion ====
Penile inversion is a very common vaginoplasty technique. The testicles and scrotum are removed and the glans of the penis is made into a clitoris. A canal is surgically created between the bladder and the rectum. Skin from the shaft of the penis is inverted to form the interior walls of the neovagina. Additionally, skin from the scrotum may be used to line the walls of the neovagina after cauterising the hair follicles. The urethra is shortened, and the mons pubis, labia majora and minora, and urethral opening are created using scrotal and urethral tissue.

Because this technique inverts the skin of the penis to form the walls of the neovagina, post-operative depth is limited by the length of the penis prior to surgery. Following surgery, a patient will need to dilate the neovagina with a vaginal dilator 1-2 times daily to prevent loss of vaginal depth. The need to dilate becomes less frequent with time, but is recommended at least once a week after the neovagina has healed completely. Having penetrative sex can affect the amount of dilation needed, but additional lubricant is required during penetrative sex as the neovagina created through penile inversion vaginoplasty is not self-lubricating.

In a small number of cases (roughly 0-5%), rectal injury can occur as an intraoperative complication. Other common complications include meatal stenosis, urinary retention, or haemorrhage.

==== Peritoneal vaginoplasty ====
Transgender peritoneal vaginoplasty, a.k.a. peritoneal pull-down or pull-through (PPT), is based on neovaginal techniques documented in the 1970s and 80s for cisgender women born without a vaginal canal due to agenesis/atresia, which were referred to as the "Davydov" procedure or "Rothman's" method. A 2022 review states, "In the last 5 years, peritoneal flap vaginoplasty has emerged as a promising technique".

This form of vaginoplasty utilizes tissue of the peritoneum to form the canal lining of the neovagina.

For trans women who had their puberty blocked, insufficient penile and scrotal skin may be available for traditional penile inversion. In such cases, peritoneal vaginoplasty remedies the issue of insufficient tissue. Peritoneal vaginoplasty can be used as a surgical revision to increase or restore vaginal depth in persons who have had a previous vaginoplasty.

This technique has been reported to provide some degree of vaginal lubrication. This lubrication, however, is not responsive to sexual arousal, and functions more as regular vaginal discharge while not identical to natal vaginal fluids.

Peritoneal vaginoplasty does not require the removal of the penis, allowing penile-sparing vaginoplasty (PSV) to be performed. This results in a bigenital configuration, which is desirable to salmacian individuals. PSV may also incorporate scrotal skin, a skin graft, an allograft, or a xenograft, alongside or instead of the peritoneum, to create the lining of the neovagina.

==== Bowel vaginoplasty ====
Bowel vaginoplasty is another common vaginoplasty technique. It is also used for vaginoplasty in cisgender women. As with penile inversion vaginoplasty, the testicles and scrotum are removed, the glans made into a clitoris, and the neovulva constructed from scrotal, penile and urethral tissue. However, in bowel vaginoplasty a segment of rectosigmoid colon is grafted into a surgically created canal to form the neovagina.

As bowel vaginoplasty uses colon to construct the neovagina, post-operative depth is not dependent on the length of the penis prior to surgery. This makes it appropriate for individuals who have already undergone penectomy, orchiectomy, or who had a penis smaller than the desired depth of the neovagina prior to surgery. Unlike penile inversion vaginoplasty, the neovagina created through bowel vaginoplasty is self-lubricating and does not require further dilation once fully healed. A 2023 review, however, has found no difference between self-lubrication across different techniques in response to arousal.

==== Jejunum vaginoplasty ====
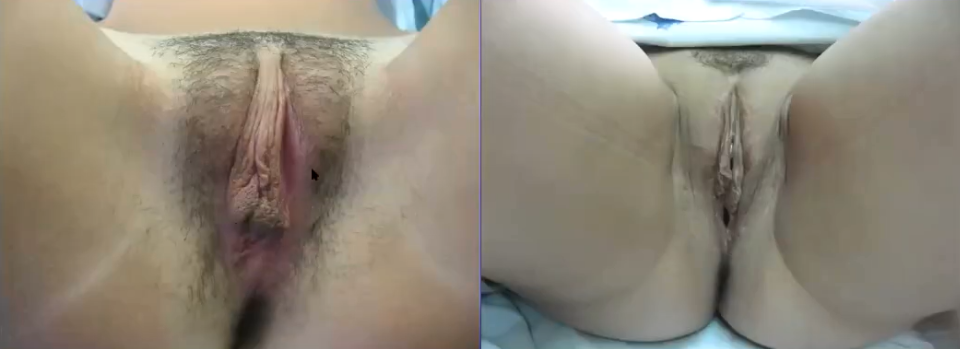

Result of jejunum vaginoplasty

Jejunum vaginoplasty uses a segment of the jejunum to create the neovagina. The approach was created to solve some of the shortcomings of skin graft, peritoneal, and colonic vaginoplasties. Jejunum vaginoplasty has been historically successful when performed in natal females.

=== Vulvoplasty ===
Vulvoplasty is the process of constructing a neovulva from existing genital tissue. The testicles, scrotum, and penis are removed, and the glans made into a clitoris. The urethra is shortened, and the mons pubis, labia majora and minora, and urethral opening are created using scrotal and urethral tissue. Unlike vaginoplasty, a neovagina is not created.

Because vulvoplasty does not create a neovagina, it is appropriate for individuals who do not wish to have vaginal sex following surgery or who are not interested in the increased aftercare routine of vaginoplasty.

=== Orchiectomy ===
Orchiectomy is the process of removing the testicles from the body. It can be performed with or without removing the scrotum. An incision is made in the middle of the scrotum and the spermatic cord stitched to prevent excessive bleeding. The testicles are then removed through the incision.

An individual who undergoes an orchiectomy will produce very little testosterone due to the removal of their testicles. This natural reduction in testosterone eliminates the need to take antiandrogen medication, which in turn can reduce the need to take supplemental estrogen medication.

== Other related procedures ==
=== Facial feminization surgery ===
Occasionally these basic procedures are complemented further with feminizing cosmetic surgeries or procedures that modify bone or cartilage structures, typically in the jaw, brow, forehead, nose and cheek areas. These are known as facial feminization surgery or FFS.

=== Breast augmentation ===
Breast augmentation is the enlargement of the breasts. Some trans women choose to undergo this procedure if hormone therapy does not yield satisfactory results. Usually, typical growth for trans women is one to two cup sizes below closely related females such as the mother or sisters. Oestrogen is responsible for fat distribution to the breasts, hips and buttocks, while progesterone is responsible for developing the actual milk glands. Progesterone also rounds out the breast to an adult Tanner stage-5 shape and matures and darkens the areola.

=== Voice feminization surgery ===
Some MTF individuals may elect to have voice surgery, which alters an individual's vocal range or pitch. However, this procedure carries a risk of impairing a trans woman's voice forever. Since estrogen alone does not alter a person's vocal range or pitch, some people take the risk that comes along with voice feminization surgery. Other options, like voice feminization lessons, are available to people wishing to speak with less masculine mannerisms.

=== Tracheal shave ===
A tracheal shave procedure is also sometimes used to reduce the cartilage in the area of the throat and minimize the appearance of the Adam's apple in order to assimilate to female physical features.

=== Buttock augmentation ===
Some MTF individuals will choose to undergo buttock augmentation because anatomically, male hips and buttocks are generally smaller than those presented on a female. If, however, efficient hormone therapy is conducted before the patient is past puberty, the pelvis will broaden slightly, and even if the patient is past their teen years, a layer of subcutaneous fat will be distributed over the body, rounding contours. Trans women usually end up with a waist to hip ratio of around 0.8, and if estrogen is administered at a young enough age "before the bone plates close", some trans women may achieve a waist to hip ratio of 0.7 or lower. The pubescent pelvis will broaden under estrogen therapy even if the skeleton is anatomically masculine.

== History ==
Lili Elbe was the first well-known recipient of male-to-female sex reassignment surgery, in Germany in 1930, the first being Dora Richter. She was the subject of four surgeries: one for orchiectomy, one to transplant an ovary, one for penectomy, and one for vaginoplasty and a uterus transplant. However, Elbe died three months after her last operation.

Christine Jorgensen was likely the most famous recipient of sex reassignment surgery, having her surgery done in Denmark in late 1952 and being outed right afterwards. She was a strong advocate for the rights of transgender people.

French actress and singer Coccinelle travelled to Casablanca in 1958 to undergo a vaginoplasty by Georges Burou. She said later, "Dr Burou rectified the mistake nature had made and I became a real woman, on the inside as well as the outside. After the operation, the doctor just said, 'Bonjour, Mademoiselle', and I knew it had been a success."

Another famous person to undergo male-to-female sex reassignment surgery was Renée Richards. She transitioned and had surgery in the mid-1970s, and successfully advocated to have transgender people recognized in U.S. sports.

The first physician to perform sex reassignment surgery in the United States was Los Angeles-based urologist Elmer Belt, who quietly performed operations from the early 1950s until 1968. In 1966, Johns Hopkins University opened the first sex reassignment surgery clinic in America. The Hopkins Gender Identity Clinic was made up of two plastic surgeons, two psychiatrists, two psychologists, a gynecologist, a urologist, and a pediatrician.

In 1997, Sergeant Sylvia Durand became the first serving member of the Canadian Forces to transition from male to female, and became the first member of any military worldwide to transition openly while serving. On Canada Day of 1998, the military changed her legal name to Sylvia and changed her sex designation on all of her personal file documents. In 1999, the military paid for her sex reassignment surgery. Durand continued to serve and was promoted to the rank of Warrant Officer. When she retired in 2012, after more than 31 years of service, she was the assistant to the Canadian Forces Chief Communications Operator.

In 2017, for the first time, the United States Defense Health Agency approved payment for sex reassignment surgery for an active-duty U.S. military service member. The patient, an infantry soldier who identifies as a woman, had already begun a course of treatment for gender reassignment. The procedure, which the treating doctor deemed medically necessary, was performed on November 14 at a private hospital, since U.S. military hospitals lack the requisite surgical expertise.

== See also ==
- Gender-affirming surgery, surgical procedures to affirm gender identity
- List of transgender-related topics
- Masculinizing surgery, masculinizing surgery for transgender men
- Uterus transplantation, a surgical procedure
