= Metoidioplasty =

Surgical procedure used to create a penis from the clitoris

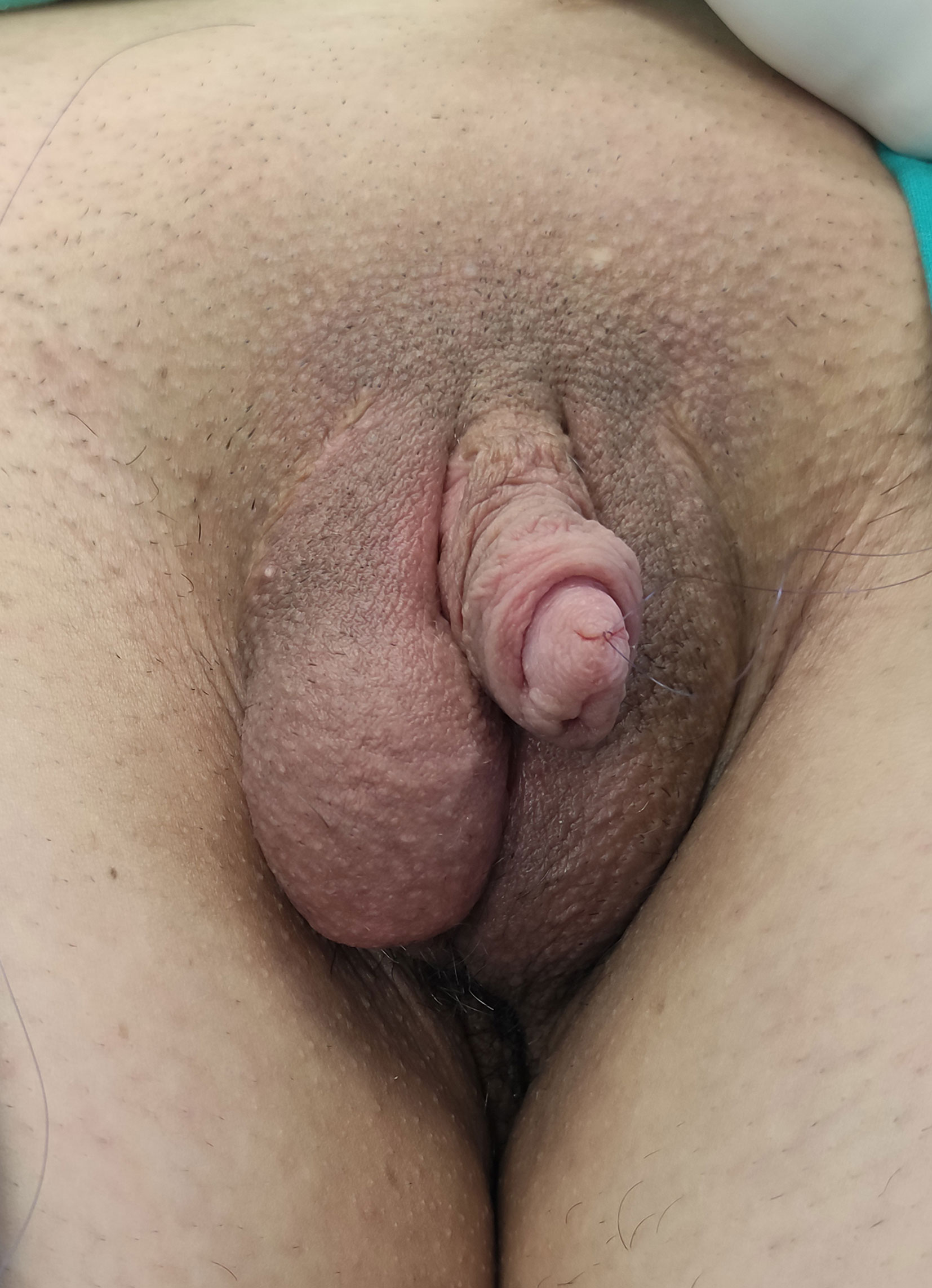
Example of completed metoidioplasty including neourethra and scrotoplasty, two years post-operation

Metoidioplasty, metaoidioplasty, or metaidoioplasty (informally called a meto or meta) is a female-to-male gender-affirming surgery.

Testosterone replacement therapy gradually enlarges the clitoris to a mean maximum size of 4.6 cm (1.8 in) (as the clitoris and the penis are developmentally homologous). In a metoidioplasty, the urethral plate and urethra are completely dissected from the clitoral corporeal bodies, then divided at the distal (far) end, and the testosterone-enlarged clitoris straightened out and elongated. A longitudinal vascularized island flap is configured and harvested from the dorsal skin of the clitoris, reversed to the ventral side, tubularized and an anastomosis (connection) is formed with the native urethra. The new urethral meatus is placed along the neophallus (newly formed penis) to the distal end and the skin of the neophallus and scrotum reconstructed using labia minora and majora flaps. The new neophallus ranges in size from 4–10 cm (1.6–3.9 in) (with an average of 5.7 cm (2.2 in)) and has the approximate girth of a human adult thumb.

The term derives from meta- "change", Ancient Greek αἰδοῖον, aidoion, 'genitals', and -plasty, denoting surgical construction or modification.

== Operation ==
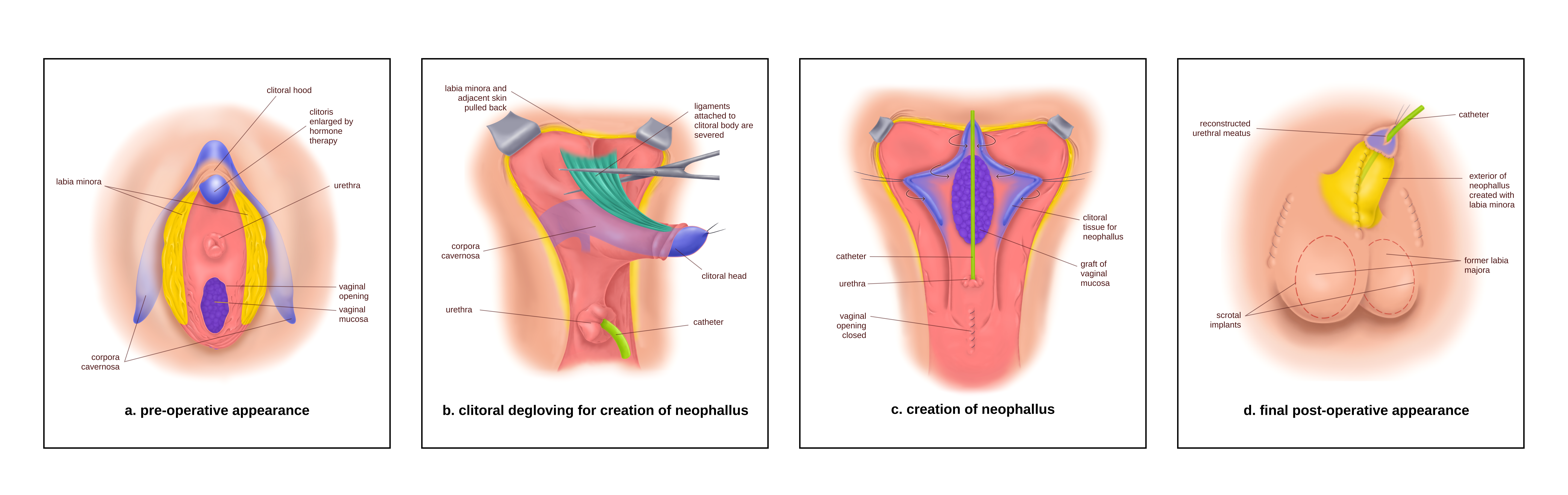
Metoidioplasty procedure (via 'Belgrade technique'). A) Preoperative appearance (hormonally enlarged clitoris). B) Cutting of ligaments that suspend the clitoris to elongate it. C) Division of urethral plate with gap filled with vaginal mucosa graft D) Combining the vascularized labial tissue with the formed urethra to form final structure.

=== Alternative techniques ===
Recent studies have introduced an operative technique known as extensive metoidioplasty. This method extensively detaches the clitoris, nearly completely detaching it from the pubic arch before its reattachment and elongation. Current studies show this method yielding penile lengths of 6 to 12 centimeters (2.4 to 4.7 in), with 7 out of 10 patients able to obtain erections that are capable of penetrative intercourse.

Extended metoidioplasty is a more recent technique which attempts to refine extensive metoidioplasty. Both methods work on the same principle of releasing, thereby exposing, more of the clitoris. A study on 17 patients a range of 4–9cm increase in phallic length. Penetration was possible for 4, and 2 had significant length and growth during erection, but had not attempted sexual intercourse yet. Both methods are considered experimental, and are only offered by a few surgeons.

== Complications ==
Complications from metoidioplasty vary in severity. Minor complications may be resolved through minor supportive care, while more serious complications may require surgical correction. Like other surgical procedures, each metoidioplasty procedure comes with the possibility of complications such as pain, infection, bleeding, blood clots, and damage to surrounding tissues. There is also a risk of adverse reactions to anesthesia or other medications that are required for the procedure or post-operative period.

If urethral lengthening is performed, urethral complications such as urinary fistula may occur. Patients who experience postvoid incontinence or dribbling following surgery report their symptoms as resolved within three months.

Satisfaction rates among patients who undergo metoidioplasty are generally very high regarding both appearance and sexual satisfaction.

== Comparison with phalloplasty ==
Metoidioplasty is technically simpler than phalloplasty, more affordable, and has fewer potential complications. However, phalloplasty patients are far more likely to be capable of sexual penetration (mainly due to size constraints) after they recover from surgery.

In a phalloplasty, a plastic surgeon fabricates a neopenis by autografting tissue from a donor site (such as from the patient's back, arm or leg). A phalloplasty takes about 8–10 hours to complete (the first stage), and is generally followed by multiple (up to three) additional surgical procedures including glansplasty, scrotoplasty, testicular prosthesis, and/or penile implantation.

Metoidioplasty typically requires 2–3 hours to complete. Because the clitoris' erectile tissue functions normally, a prosthesis is unnecessary for erection (although the clitoris might not become as rigid as a penile erection). In nearly all cases, metoidioplasty patients can continue to have clitoral orgasms after surgery.

Note also, that the two alternative techniques are not mutually exclusive and phalloplasty extension of a metioidiplasic base neophallus is possible.

== History ==
The first metoidioplasty was reported in 1973 and the term was coined in a 1989 paper.

== See also ==
- List of transgender-related topics
- Phalloplasty
