= Penile implants in spinal cord injury =

Medical treatment related to male sexual health

Penile implants may be employed to treat erectile dysfunction or urinary troubles after a spinal cord injury.

== Indications ==
=== Erectile dysfunction ===
Penile erection depends on both psychogenic and mechanical stimuli. Nevertheless, in order for the body to properly react to these stimuli, an intact nervous system is essential. Therefore, erectile dysfunction is a common finding among men with SCI. Most men with SCI are in their prime reproductive years, so their libido is unlikely to be impaired and erectile dysfunction is less likely to be caused by factors other than the SCI itself. Depending on the level and extent of the SCI, men can retain some or most of their erectile capacity, however, in many instances, this is not enough to perform proper intercourse.

Treatment usually starts with oral medications such as PDE-5 Inhibitors. If these fail or are contraindicated for another reason, intracavernous injections or penile vacuum pumps are often considered as alternative options. The last resort in treating erectile dysfunction in SCI patients is the implantation of a penile prosthesis.

=== Urinary complaints ===
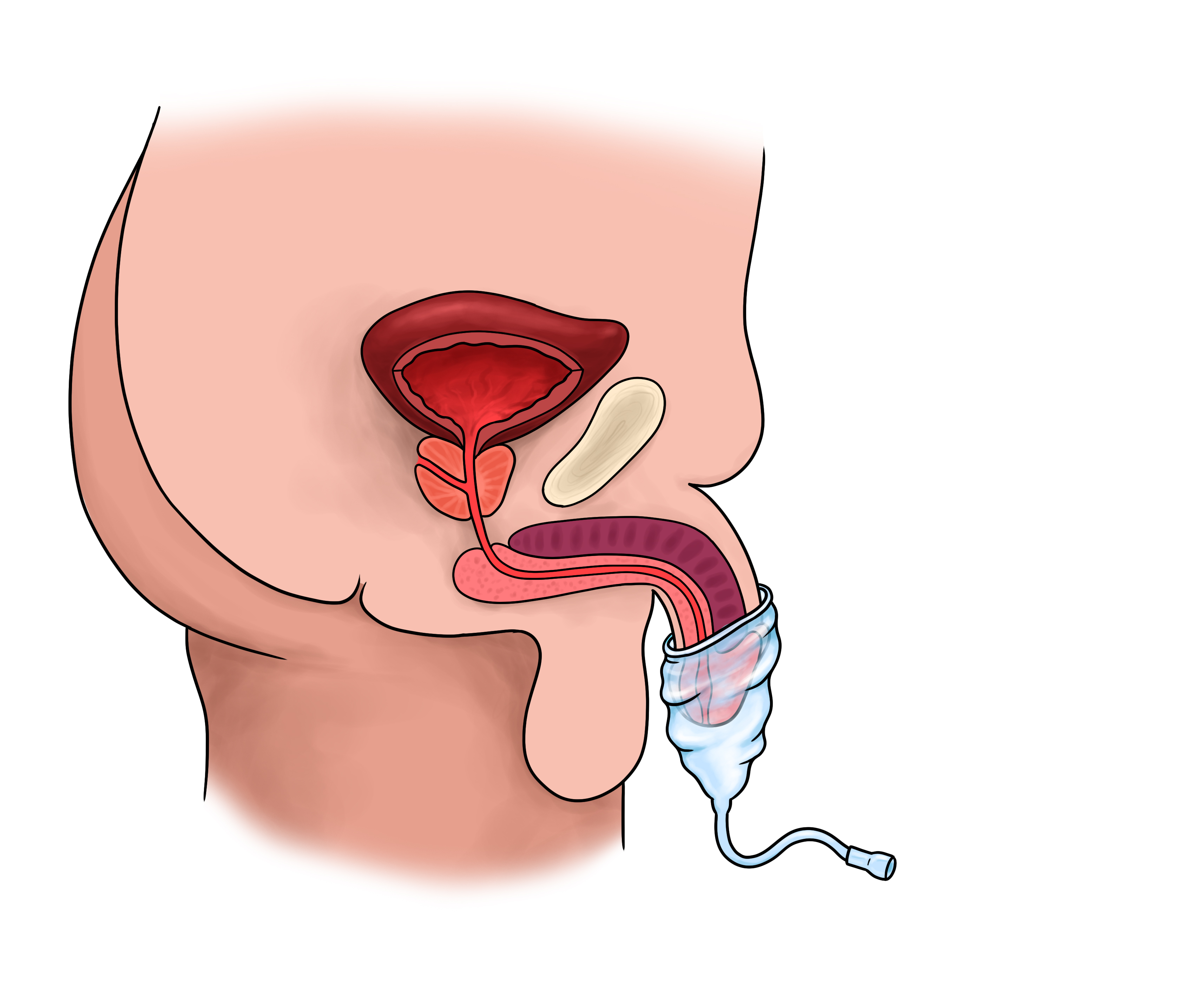
Penile retraction - The external urine collecting device tends to slip away from the penis.

Another problem that patients with SCI face is urinary incontinence due to neurogenic bladder. The problem is usually managed by suprapubic catheterisation, intermittent catheterisation or external urine collection devices (like condom catheters).

Applying external urine collection devices and clean intermittent catheterisation can be problematic in men with SCI for several reasons. The most notable is "penile retraction", where the penis retracts backward into the surrounding tissue and foreskin. Obesity, pelvic bending (in sitting position), and penile atrophy can all exacerbate this problem by burying the penis even deeper in the surrounding tissue. Penile retraction prevents the proper placement of external urine collection devices which can result in urine leaking from them, causing skin irritation and skin lacerations. Some men may also use tape to hold the catheter in place, which can worsen these skin issues. When this happens, a Foley catheter might be inserted to allow the skin to dry and heal.

Penile implants can be useful in managing this problem by allowing for the proper placement of external urine collection devices, easier intermittent self-catheterization, and reducing the incidence of skin lacerations requiring Foley catheters. Moreover, from a renal standpoint, the best renal prognosis in SCI patients is achieved by avoiding having to introduce a foreign body into the bladder (like Foley catheters). This is what makes implanting a penile prosthesis for maintaining external collection devices (condom catheter) a favorable choice.

== Penile implants ==
Penile implants are used in treating erectile dysfunction in men who fail medical therapy. Several types of penile implant exist on the market, and these can broadly be classified as inflatable or non-inflatable (semi-rigid and soft) penile implants.

=== Semi-rigid and soft implants ===
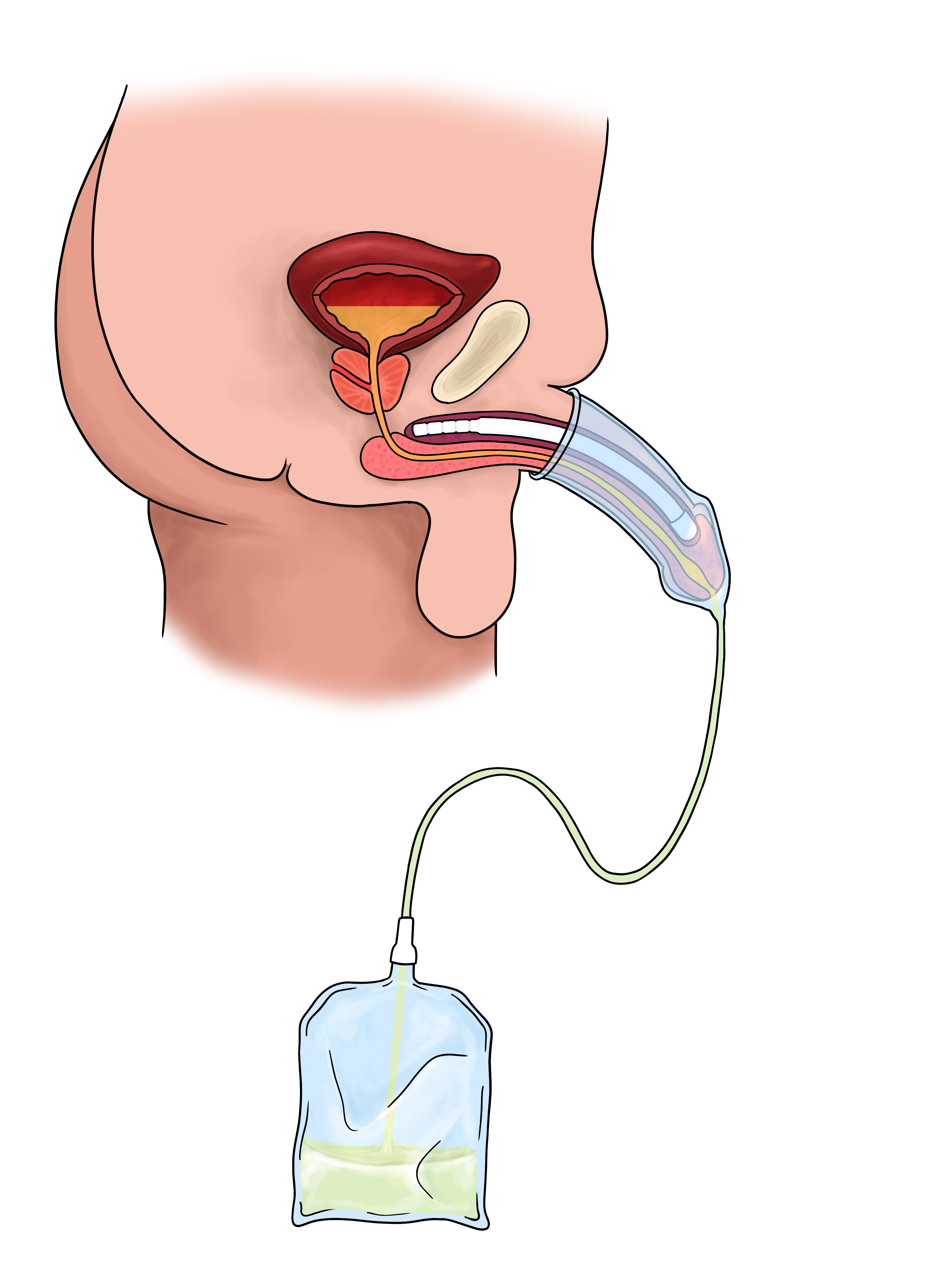
How the soft penile implant ZSI 100 CF helps secure the external collection device

These are a pair of cylinders inserted into the corpora of the penis. These implants can be further divided into two types: semi-rigid (malleable) implants that have a metallic rod at their core, and soft implants that have no metallic cores. After implanting semi-rigid and soft implants, the penis can be adjusted as needed to achieve a position suitable for performing sex, applying external urinary collection devices, or performing clean intermittent catheterization. Soft penile implants seem to carry less risk of penile perforation in patients with SCI.

=== Inflatable implants ===
The inflatable penile implant is composed of two inflatable cylinders implanted into the penis and connected to a pump system. The implants available are either 2-piece implants or 3-piece implants. The pump unit is usually implanted in the scrotum and reservoir in the pelvis. The device works by inflating the cylinders with saline solution when the pump is pressed by the patient. Deflation can be performed in the same manner – by pressing the pump.

=== Comparison ===
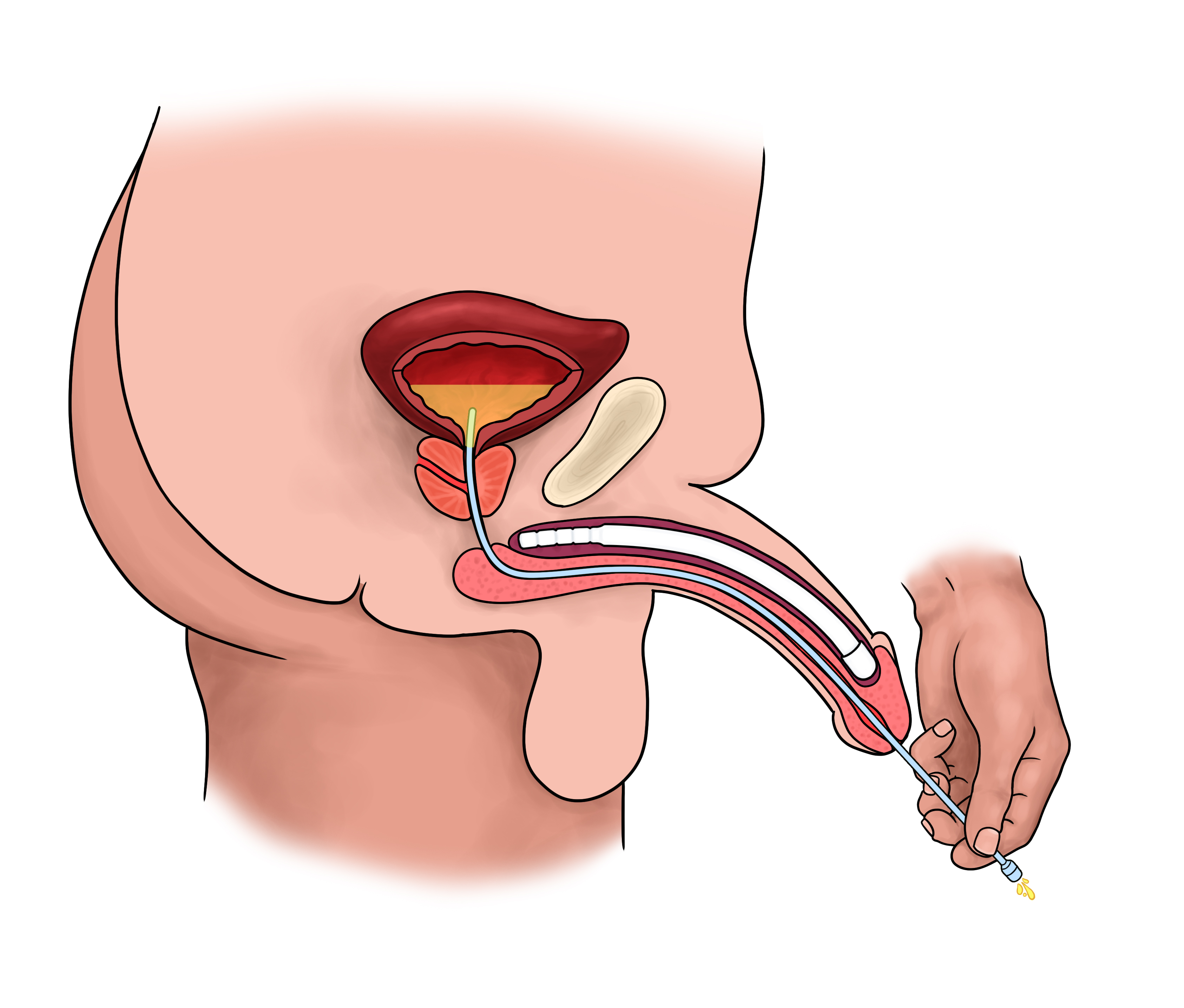
How the soft penile implant ZSI 100 CF helps easier catheterization

Semi-rigid and inflatable implant devices are not considered very suitable in tetraplegics who lack hand function, since they require finger dexterity to activate or deactivate the inflatable device. Soft penile implants might be more suitable for use in men with SCI and, in addition, they seem to carry less risk of perforation, since the soft implant has less direct force to the glans. The insertion of the inflatable penile implant pump unit in the scrotum and the reservoir in the pelvis may be problematic in certain men with previous surgeries in the areas. Anterior sphincterotomy and transurethral resection of the bladder neck and prostate may still be performed after insertion of a soft penile prosthesis.

The list shows penile implants available in the market in 2020:

Product	Company	Country of origin	Type of the implant	Introduced in
AMS Spectra	Boston Scientific (formerly American Medical Systems)	United States of America	Semi-rigid	2009
Tactra	Boston Scientific (formerly American Medical Systems)	United States of America	Semi-rigid	2019
Genesis	Coloplast	United States of America	Semi-rigid	2004
ZSI 100, ZSI 100 FtM and ZSI 100 D4	Zephyr Surgical Implants	Switzerland	Semi-rigid	2012
Tube	Promedon	Argentina	Semi-rigid	2007
ZSI 100 CF	Zephyr Surgical Implants	Switzerland	Soft	2019
AMS Ambicor	Boston Scientific (formerly American Medical Systems)	United States of America	Inflatable	1994
AMS 700 series (LGX, CX, CXR)	Boston Scientific (formerly American Medical Systems)	United States of America	Inflatable	1983
Titan	Coloplast	United States of America	Inflatable	2002
ZSI 475 and ZSI 475 FtM	Zephyr Surgical Implants	Switzerland	Inflatable	2012

== Outcomes ==
Since the 1980s, several studies have been published to assess the outcomes of penile implants in treating erectile dysfunction and urinary problems in men with SCI.

=== Erectile dysfunction ===
In 2006, a large study was done on 245 patients with different neurological conditions causing erectile dysfunction who were treated with penile implants after conservative treatment failed. The mean age of the patients was 40 and the mean follow-up time was 7.2 years. Inflatable, semi-rigid, and soft implants were used. In treating erectile dysfunction, the study reported 83.7% of patients were able to perform sexual intercourse and 82.6% were satisfied with the overall results (including the improvement in urinary management). 67% of the female partners of the men involved in the study said they were satisfied with the result. The study reported high erosion rate with semi-rigid implants, however, the rate decreased dramatically in later years of the study with the introduction of soft penile implants. Another study done in 1996 on 209 men, all of whom had SCI, to investigate sexual and urinary problems showed that 84% of men involved in the study were able to perform satisfactory sexual intercourse.

=== Urinary management ===
In most cases, implanting a penile prosthesis in a man with a SCI will improve the application of external urinary collection devices. This stands to reduce the incidence of leakage, skin irritation and laceration as well as the need for Foley catheter insertion. In a 2006 study, Zermann et al. found that 90.3% of the men who received a penile implant for urinary management reported that their urinary related problems were resolved after surgery. Kimoto et al. found in 1994 that 93% of the men who had received penile implants for urinary management (a total of 51 men) reported that they were satisfied with the result of the surgery. In 1996, Gross et al. reported a 92% success rate in a study done on patients with urinary problems secondary to SCI (113 patients).

== Complications ==
The complication rate during penile prosthesis implantation surgery seems to be higher in men with SCI than those without the condition. The most commonly reported complications are the following:

- Infection is the most common complication. The risk is reduced with newer sterile techniques.
- Perforation (depends on the type of implant: less likely in soft implants)
- Mechanical dysfunction of the prosthesis (more common in inflatable)
