= Eroxon =

Over-the-counter topical gel for erectile dysfunction

- Type: Medical device (topical gel)
- Inventor: Futura Medical
- Inception: April 2021; 5 years ago (CE mark)
- Manufacturer: Futura Medical
- Available: Europe, United States, Latin America, Middle East
- Current supplier: Cooper Consumer Health (Europe); Market Performance Group (United States)
- Models: Eroxon, Eroxon Intense
- Website: www.eroxon.com

Eroxon (development code MED3000) is an over-the-counter topical gel used as a treatment for erectile dysfunction (ED). Its manufacturer is Futura Medical. The gel is regulated as a medical device and not as a drug, because its mode of action is a physical one and it doesn't have an active pharmaceutical ingredient. In clinical trials, about 60% of men reported reaching an erection within ten minutes after applying the gel. The U.S. Food and Drug Administration (FDA) authorised Eroxon for marketing in June 2023. In its decision, the FDA approved Eroxon as a medical device for the treatment of erectile disfunction that is applied on the penis and leads to erection.

Eroxon is the first topical ED treatment sold over the counter in the United States. The gel had been on sale in Europe under a CE mark since 2023, and it reached American shops in October 2024. As of 2026, the gel is sold in the United States, United Kingdom, Europe, and several countries in Latin America and the Middle East.

== Composition ==
Eroxon is a hydro-alcoholic gel, sold in single-dose aluminium tubes. It contains water, ethanol (about 35%), propylene glycol, glycerol, carbomer and potassium hydroxide. None of these is an active pharmaceutical ingredient. Futura Medical says the effect comes from the way the ingredients are combined, and it developed the formulation under DermaSys, its trade name for a group of topical preparations.

== Mechanism of action ==
The user, or a partner, massages the gel onto the glans penis for about 15 seconds just before intercourse. In the account the FDA accepted at classification, the volatile parts of the formulation (the alcohol and the water) evaporate. This cools the glans quickly, after which the skin returns more slowly to body temperature, which is felt as warming. The change in temperature and pressure is said to stimulate the nerve endings of the glans, which are dense, and so to bring on tumescence and erection.

The stimulated nerve endings release nitric oxide. That would relax the smooth muscle of the corpora cavernosa and increase blood flow into the penis. The end point resembles the one reached by phosphodiesterase type 5 inhibitors such as sildenafil and tadalafil, though by a physical route: the gel is not meant to work by passing through the skin or the mucous membranes.

Arthur Burnett of Johns Hopkins University, who was principal investigator on an American trial of the gel, said the mechanism was not fully understood, though the gel did seem to make the nerves of the penis sensitive enough to bring on an erection. David Ralph, a urologist at University College London who has acted as a consultant to Futura Medical and led its published MED2005 trial, reported that the skin temperature of the penis falls by about 10°C within a minute of application.

== Development ==
Eroxon came out of work on a different product. Futura Medical, a British company based in Guildford and listed on London Stock Exchange AIM, had spent years on MED2005, a topical glyceryl trinitrate (GTN) gel. A phase II crossover study of 232 men, funded by the company and published in The Journal of Sexual Medicine in 2018, found a small but statistically significant advantage for MED2005 over placebo on the erectile function domain of the International Index of Erectile Function (IIEF).

In the phase III dose-ranging trial that followed, FM57, the arm given the gel base with no GTN in it did about as well as the arms given 0.2 to 0.6% GTN. Futura dropped the GTN. The vehicle became MED3000.

== Clinical trials ==
Two trials underpin the efficacy claims. FM57 ran for 12 weeks and enrolled 250 men who had been diagnosed with ED lasting more than three months; it was multicentre, randomised, double-blind and parallel-group, and the men or their female partners applied the gel. FM71 ran for 24 weeks and enrolled 96 men. It was open-label, and it compared MED3000 with 5 mg of oral tadalafil. The men were recruited in the United States, Poland, Georgia and Bulgaria.

Wayne Hellstrom of Tulane University School of Medicine, who had previously advised the company, presented the results to the American Urological Association in 2024. About 60% of the men in each trial reached the minimal clinically important difference on the IIEF erectile function domain. Erections inside ten minutes were reported by 60.1% of the FM57 group and 44.9% of the FM71 group. Fewer than 2% of the men using MED3000 reported adverse events, against about 4% of those taking tadalafil. Headache affected 3% of the MED3000 group and 19.1% of the tadalafil group, and roughly 1% of MED3000 users reported a burning sensation of the penis. Over the 24 weeks of FM71, Futura reported, tadalafil improved erectile function more than MED3000 did, but MED3000 worked faster.

The results have appeared only in conference abstracts and company announcements. A company spokesperson told The Washington Post in 2023 that the full data were being held back for competitive reasons.

== Regulatory history ==
Eroxon was given a CE mark in Europe in April 2021 on the strength of the FM57 data, and a UKCA mark in the United Kingdom in April 2022. In both cases it was classed as a Class IIb medical device that could be sold without a prescription.

Futura submitted a De Novo classification request to the FDA on 21 October 2022. The agency concluded that special controls would give reasonable assurance of the device's safety and effectiveness, put it in Class II, and granted marketing authorisation on 9 June 2023, under request number DEN220078, for the treatment of erectile dysfunction in men aged 22 and over. Three regulators had by then allowed the gel to be sold without a prescription in their markets.

== Commercialisation ==
Eroxon went on sale in the United Kingdom and Belgium in the spring of 2023. It reached Boots shops on 18 April 2023 and cost £24.99 for four single-dose tubes. Cooper Consumer Health later took it into France, Italy, Spain and Portugal.

Futura licensed the United States rights to Haleon in July 2023. The gel went on sale there in October 2024 through retailers including Walmart, Walgreens and CVS Pharmacy. Futura reported that sales had progressed more slowly than expected. In June 2026 Futura ended the arrangement, took back the American rights in return for a termination fee, and handed distribution to the commerce agency Market Performance Group from that September. The gel is also sold in parts of Latin America and the Middle East.

== Reception ==
News coverage of the FDA decision dwelt on the speed of onset. Oral PDE5 inhibitors usually need half an hour or more, and they are ruled out for some patients; Eroxon, its makers say, works in ten minutes and carries none of those contraindications. The trial data were presented to the American Urological Association in 2024, and an editorial on the gel appeared in the World Journal of Men's Health the same year.

Several urologists treated the gel as a useful addition to a short list of options. Arthur Burnett of Johns Hopkins University, who was principal investigator on an American trial of the gel, called it another item on the menu for the millions of men with the condition, and an intriguing therapy that widened the range of treatments available. Scott Lundy of the Cleveland Clinic thought it might suit the right patient if the results held up, though he did not regard it as a replacement for tadalafil, which improves erectile function considerably more. Seth Cohen of NYU Langone Health welcomed a treatment men could buy without an appointment, since embarrassment keeps many of them away from a doctor. Writing in the World Journal of Men's Health, the Korean urologist Se Young Choi took the mechanism to be novel and the safety record good, and called for more research. In the company's trials, headache was reported by 3% of the men using the gel against 19.1% of those taking tadalafil.

Scepticism has centred on the strength of the published evidence rather than on any suggestion of harm. Because MED3000 began as the control preparation in a trial of something else, several clinicians have asked whether it beats placebo at all. Stanton Honig of Yale School of Medicine said he had found no published paper showing that it does, and thought there was too little data for sexual medicine specialists to recommend it. The syndicated physician columnist Keith Roach wrote that Eroxon is essentially the MED2005 placebo sold in its own right; he accepted that the gel is safe and helps a fair number of men, but thought it expensive for what it is. Kevin McVary of the Loyola University Chicago Stritch School of Medicine told Medscape that the comparison trial was poorly designed, since 5 mg of tadalafil is not absorbed for something like two and a half hours and could hardly be expected to act within ten minutes.

How much the gel can do for severe cases is also disputed. Cohen doubted that a topical preparation could reach the arteries deep in the penis, and expected it to help only the mildest cases. Both Cohen and McVary added that men who treat themselves off the shelf should still see a doctor, because erectile dysfunction can be an early sign of undiagnosed cardiovascular disease.

== Related products ==
Futura Medical has announced Eroxon Intense, a variant of the gel meant to give a stronger sensory effect, which received CE and UKCA clearance in 2026.

== See also ==
- Vacuum erection device
- Penile prosthesis
