= Viagra (disambiguation) =

Viagra is a brand name for sildenafil, used for treating erectile dysfunction.

Viagra may also refer to:

- VIA Gra or Nu Virgos, a Russian-Ukrainian girl group
- "Stay Up! (Viagra)", a 2008 song by 88-Keys
- "Viagra" (Ray Donovan), a 2014 television episode

== See also ==
- Herbal viagra, various herbal products
- Viagra Boys, Swedish rock band
- Los Viagras, Mexican drug cartel
- Viagra Triangle, Chicago neighborhood
