= Cock ring =

Sexual device

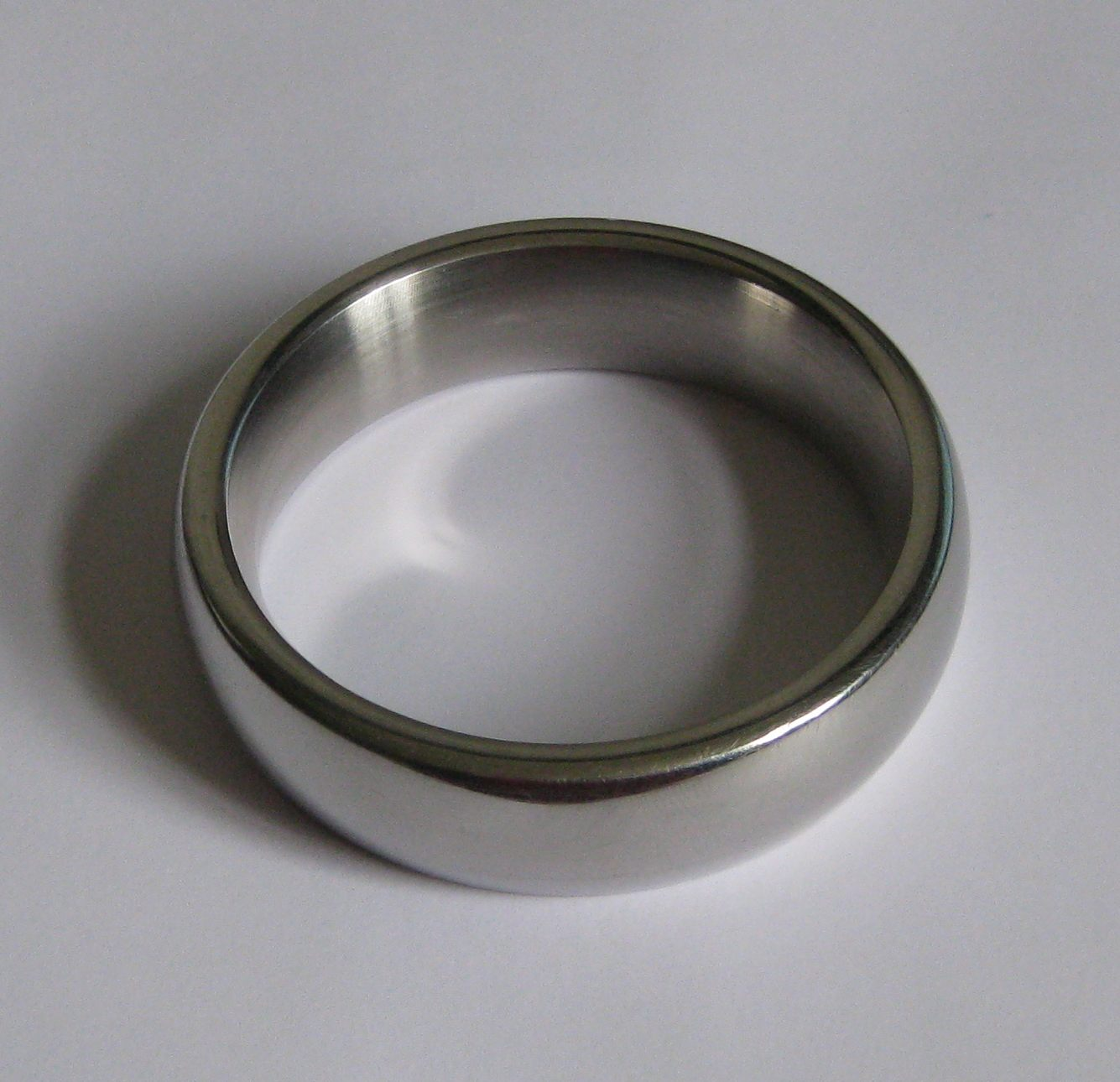
Metal cock ring

A cock ring (Note: Also known as a cockring, C ring, erection ring, penis ring, shaft ring, tension ring, or Arab strap.) is a sex toy worn around the penis, usually at the base. The primary purpose of wearing a cock ring is to restrict the flow of blood from the erect penis to produce a stronger erection. It can also be used to increase girth and/or to maintain an erection for a longer period of time.

When used in cases of erectile dysfunction (ED), they are known by various other names, such as erection rings and tension rings. They are sometimes used as medical devices, on their own or in conjunction with a penis pump to assist in the management of erectile dysfunction.

== Medical ==
An erection ring may be worn to treat erectile dysfunction (ED). When used for ED, a purpose-designed vacuum pump is used to produce an erection by simple mechanical and hydrodynamical action in spite of vascular or nerve damage, and the ring is slid off the pump's cylinder onto the base of the penis to maintain the erection before it is lost. When used with a pump, a lubricating gel is always used to help the pump maintain a vacuum. The gel also makes it easier for the ring to slide off the pump, and later, to remove it from the penis.

== Risks ==
Medical sources indicate that cock rings are not to be worn for more than about 30 minutes. Falling asleep or using illicit drugs at the same time is very dangerous. The first sign of pending problems is when the penis starts to become numb, painful, or cold. As soon as this happens, the cock ring must be removed, ideally sooner.

=== Medical issues ===
Cock rings that are too tight or worn for too long can be dangerous: this may cause priapism, a medical emergency that, if not treated promptly, can result in severe and permanent damage, including penile gangrene that can result in the destruction and possible amputation of the penis. Rings for erectile dysfunction are invariably supplied with the instruction that they should not be left on for more than thirty minutes. Falling asleep with a ring on is a particular danger. This may lead to temporary or permanent nerve damage. Numbness in the glans penis, penis becoming cold or penis becoming white may be signs that a cock ring has been worn for too long and medical advice should be sought.
