= Proximal diabetic neuropathy =

- Other names: Diabetic Amyotrophy, Diabetic Lumbar Plexopathy, Bruns-Garland syndrome
- Specialty: Neurology

Proximal diabetic neuropathy, also known as diabetic amyotrophy, is a complication of diabetes mellitus that affects the nerves that supply the thighs, hips, buttocks and/or lower legs. Proximal diabetic neuropathy is a type of diabetic neuropathy characterized by muscle wasting, weakness, pain, or changes in sensation/numbness of the leg. It is caused by damage to the nerves of the lumbosacral plexus.

Proximal diabetic neuropathy is most commonly seen in people with type 2 diabetes. It is less common than distal polyneuropathy that often occurs in diabetes.

== Signs and symptoms ==
Signs and symptoms of proximal diabetic neuropathy depend on the nerves affected. The first symptom is usually pain in the buttocks, hips, thighs or legs. This pain often starts suddenly and affects one side of the body, although may spread to both sides. This is often followed by variable weakness in the proximal muscles of the lower limbs such as the thigh and buttocks. The damage to nerves supplying specific muscles may cause muscle twitching (fasciculations) in addition to the weakness. It is sometimes associated with weight loss.

Diabetes most commonly causes damage to the long nerves that supply the feet and lower legs, causing numbness, tingling and pain (diabetic polyneuropathy). Although these symptoms may also be present, the pain and weakness of proximal diabetic neuropathy often onset more quickly and affect nerves closer to the torso.

== Causes ==
This condition most commonly affects people with type 2 diabetes, although sometimes presents in those without diabetes (nondiabetic lumbosacral radiculoplexus neuropathy). The population trends suggest that hyperglycemia likely plays a role but may not be the causative factor.

The nerve damage associated with the disease was first thought to be caused by metabolic changes such as endoneurial microvessel disease, in which cells that support the endothelium (pericytes) are damaged due to high blood sugar. Pericytes regulate capillary blood flow and phagocytosis of cellular debris and ischemia of the nerves can occur if pericytes are damaged. A different potential mechanism involves an immune mechanism causing a microvasculitis which could lead to ischemia.

== Diagnosis ==
Patients with diabetes and proximal (hip, thigh) pain and weakness may be suspected of having femoral neuropathy or diabetic amyotrophy. More definitive diagnosis can be made with electrodiagnostic studies including nerve conduction studies (NCS) and electromyography (EMG). Diabetic amyotrophy is often a diagnosis of exclusion in diabetic patients with evidence of lumbosacral plexopathy on NCS and EMG studies for whom no other cause of lumbosacral plexopathy can be determined.

Diabetic femoral neuropathy is typically associated with type 2 diabetes and progresses from a uni-lateral thigh pain to muscle weakness and atrophy.

== Treatment ==
Proximal diabetic neuropathy can be prevented through management of diabetes. The incidence of proximal diabetic neuropathy incidence is thought to be correlated to blood glucose control in diabetics, and is likely reversible with improved blood glucose control.

Medications can help reduce the pain involved in proximal diabetic neuropathy. Common types of medication used to treat diabetic amyotrophy target the nerve directly such as gabapentin or pregabalin.

== Prognosis ==
Proximal diabetic neuropathy is often monophasic and will improve after initial onset. However, the pain and weakness usually do not completely resolve and may lead to impairments in mobility and function.
