= Zephyr Surgical Implants =

Swiss-based penile surgical implant manufacturer

- Company type: Private
- Industry: Health care
- Founded: 2005; 21 years ago
- Founder: Christophe Llorens (CEO)
- Headquarters: Geneva (GE), Switzerland
- Area served: Worldwide
- Key people: Raphael Llorens
- Website: zsimplants.ch

Zephyr Surgical Implants (ZSI) is a Swiss-based medical device manufacturer that produces and distributes artificial urinary sphincters and penile implants worldwide. ZSI products are used in the management of moderate-to-severe urinary incontinence in men, erectile dysfunction, Peyronie's disease, penis enlargement, and female-to-male gender reassignment surgery.

== History ==
The company was founded by Dr. Christophe Llorens and Raphael Llorens in 2005. The first product – ZSI 375 artificial urinary sphincter, was introduced in 2009. As of 2019, more than 4500 ZSI 375 artificial urinary sphincters were implanted worldwide. The inflatable penile implant designed for female-to-male gender reassignment surgeries became available in the European market in March 2016, and the first phalloplasty procedures using ZSI 475 FtM implants were performed in June 2016.

Many clinical studies have been performed with the artificial urinary sphincter ZSI 375 in the treatment of moderate and severe stress incontinence, most of them are retrospective and non-randomized tests. Success rates in total or social continence vary, in a period of 6 to 24 months, between 68 and 89%.
