= Herbal viagra =

Class of herbal products said to treat erectile dysfunction

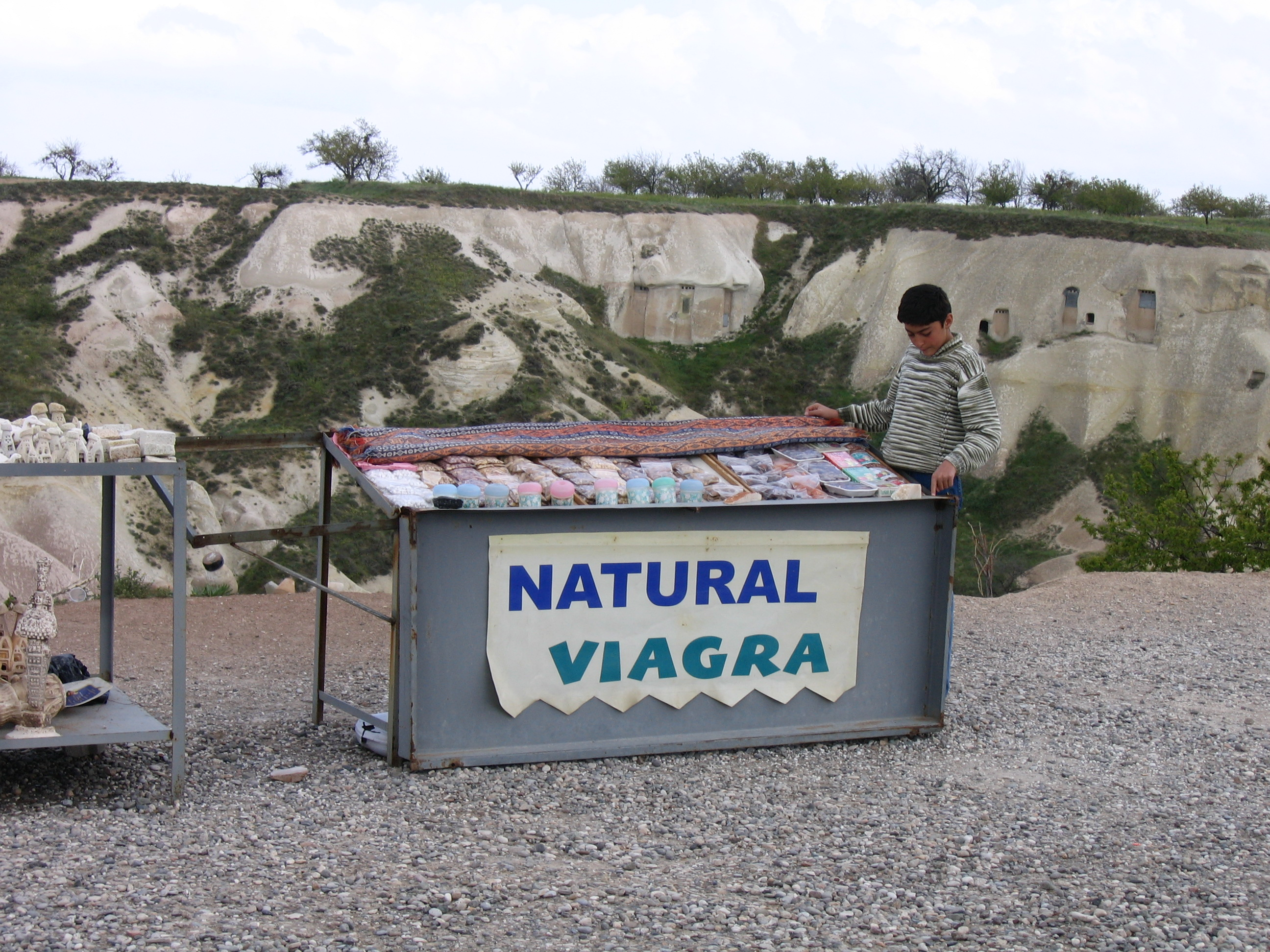
A local version of herbal viagra being sold at the roadside in Turkey.

Herbal viagra is a herbal product advertised as treating erectile dysfunction. Many different products are advertised as herbal viagra, but with varying ingredients. No clinical trials or scientific studies support the effectiveness of any of these ingredients for the treatment of erectile dysfunction and some products have been found to contain drugs and other adulterants, and have been the subject of FDA and FTC warnings and actions to remove them from the market.

The name "herbal viagra" is taken from the brand name Viagra, under which drug company Pfizer sells sildenafil citrate, a drug used to treat erectile dysfunction. Viagra has become a generic term for many people discussing drugs designed to treat erectile dysfunction, even those which do not contain sildenafil.

Herbal viagras, contrary to what the name suggests, do not normally contain sildenafil citrate. However, sildenafil and chemicals similar to sildenafil have been found as adulterants in many supplements which are sold as herbal viagra or "natural" sexual enhancement products. The United States Food and Drug Administration has warned consumers that any sexual enhancement product that claims to work as well as prescription products is likely to contain such a contaminant. Scientists estimated that over 60% of the consumed sildenafil in the Netherlands is from illegal sources such as adulterated dietary supplements.

Herbal viagras often carry a number of dangerous side effects. Primarily, they cause abnormally low blood pressure and can restrict blood flow to vital organs. Some preparations may be toxic if taken in larger doses. Additional side effects and dangers of common herbal viagra adulterants, such as sulfoaildenafil, acetildenafil and other analogs, are unknown because these ingredients have not had thorough review in human clinical trials.

Herbal viagra is predominantly sold through the internet, and in 2003 approximately 4% or 1 in 25 of all email spam offered herbal viagra, genuine pharmaceuticals, and other herbal remedies.

== Safety concerns ==
=== Adulterants ===
A health risk associated with herbal viagra products stems from undeclared pharmaceutical adulterants. FDA testing consistently reveals that products marketed as "all natural" sexual enhancement supplements contain active pharmaceutical ingredients identical to prescription medications. Laboratory analysis has identified sildenafil (Viagra) and tadalafil (Cialis) in concentrations ranging from 14 to 200 times the standard prescription dosages. Products with names such as Rhino, Spanish Fly, and ZoomMax have been found to contain these undeclared ingredients despite labeling that claims they are herbal or natural.

=== Cardiovascular risks ===
The presence of undeclared PDE5 inhibitors in herbal viagra products creates serious cardiovascular risks, particularly for men taking nitrate medications. These drug interactions can cause precipitous drops in blood pressure of 25-51 mmHg, potentially leading to cardiovascular collapse.

=== Regulatory issues ===
Unlike prescription medications, herbal sexual enhancement products are regulated as dietary supplements under the Dietary Supplement Health and Education Act, which does not require premarket safety testing or FDA approval. The FDA has issued hundreds of warnings for these products but can only respond reactively after identifying contaminated supplements in the marketplace.

=== Clinical recommendations ===
Medical organizations, including the International Society for Sexual Medicine, recommend that men experiencing erectile dysfunction undergo proper medical evaluation rather than using unregulated herbal products. This evaluation should include assessment of cardiovascular risk factors, medication interactions, and underlying health conditions that may contribute to sexual dysfunction.
