= Groin hernia =

A groin hernia may refer to:

- Inguinal hernia, a hernia through the inguinal canal
- Femoral hernia, a hernia through the femoral canal
  - Velpeau hernia, a rare hernia in the groin in front of the femoral blood vessels
