= Erectile dysfunction =

Form of sexual dysfunction in males

- Other names: Impotence
- Specialty: Urology, sexual medicine, andrology, neurology
- Symptoms: Inability to gain or maintain an erection
- Causes: Low testosterone levels, certain prescription drugs, neurogenic disorders
- Risk factors: Cardiovascular disease, diabetes, smoking, stress, mental disorders, ageing, high saturated fat diet, kidney disease, aggressive masturbation (source: https://www.hims.com/blog/masturbation-and-ed)
- Diagnostic method: Depends if psychological or physiological; absence of involuntary erections suggests physiological
- Differential diagnosis: Hypogonadism, prolactinoma
- Prevention: Adequate exercise
- Treatment: Penis pump, counseling (psychological treatment)
- Medication: Sildenafil, Tadalafil, Vardenafil

Erectile dysfunction (ED), also referred to as impotence, is a form of sexual dysfunction in males characterized by the persistent or recurring inability to achieve or maintain a penile erection with sufficient rigidity and duration for satisfactory sexual activity. It is the most common sexual problem in males and can cause psychological distress due to its impact on self-image and sexual relationships. The term erectile dysfunction does not encompass other erection-related disorders, such as priapism.

The majority of ED cases are attributed to physical risk factors and predictive factors. These factors can be categorized as vascular, neurological, local penile, hormonal, and drug-induced. Notable predictors of ED include aging, cardiovascular disease, diabetes mellitus, high blood pressure, obesity, abnormal lipid levels in the blood, hypogonadism, smoking, depression, and medication use. Approximately 10% of cases are linked to psychosocial factors, encompassing conditions such as depression, stress, and problems within relationships. ED is reported in 18% of males aged 50 to 59 years, and 37% in males aged 70 to 75.

Treatment of ED encompasses addressing the underlying causes, lifestyle modification, and addressing psychosocial issues. In many instances, medication-based therapies are used, specifically PDE5 inhibitors such as sildenafil. These drugs function by dilating blood vessels, facilitating increased blood flow into the spongy tissue of the penis, analogous to opening a valve wider to enhance water flow in a fire hose. Less frequently employed treatments encompass prostaglandin pellets inserted into the urethra, the injection of smooth-muscle relaxants and vasodilators directly into the penis, penile implants, the use of penis pumps, and vascular surgery.

== Signs and symptoms ==
ED is characterized by the persistent or recurring inability to achieve or maintain an erection of the penis with sufficient rigidity and duration for satisfactory sexual activity. It is defined as the "persistent or recurrent inability to achieve and maintain a penile erection of sufficient rigidity to permit satisfactory sexual activity for at least 3 months."

=== Psychological impact ===
ED often has an impact on the emotional well-being of both males and their partners. Many males do not seek treatment due to feelings of embarrassment. About 75% of diagnosed cases of ED go untreated.

== Causes ==
Causes of or contributors to ED include the following:

- Diets high in saturated fat are linked to heart diseases, and males with heart diseases are more likely to experience ED. By contrast, plant-based diets show a lower risk for ED.
- Prescription drugs (e.g., SSRIs, beta blockers, antihistamines, alpha-2 adrenergic receptor agonists, thiazides, hormone modulators, and 5α-reductase inhibitors)
- Neurogenic disorders (e.g., diabetic neuropathy, temporal lobe epilepsy, multiple sclerosis, Parkinson's disease, multiple system atrophy)
- Cavernosal disorders (e.g., Peyronie's disease)
- Hyperprolactinemia (e.g., due to a prolactinoma)
- Psychological causes: performance anxiety, stress, and mental disorders
- Surgery (e.g., radical prostatectomy)
- Ageing: after age 40 years, ageing itself is a risk factor for ED, although numerous other pathologies that may occur with ageing, such as testosterone deficiency, cardiovascular diseases, or diabetes, among others, appear to have interacting effects
- Kidney disease: ED and chronic kidney disease have pathological mechanisms in common, including vascular and hormonal dysfunction, and may share other comorbidities, such as hypertension and diabetes mellitus that can contribute to ED
- Lifestyle habits, particularly smoking, which is a key risk factor for ED as it promotes arterial narrowing. Due to its propensity for causing detumescence and erectile dysfunction, some studies have described tobacco as an anaphrodisiacal substance.
- COVID-19: preliminary research indicates that COVID-19 viral infection may affect sexual and reproductive health.

Surgical intervention for a number of conditions may remove anatomical structures necessary to erection, damage nerves, or impair blood supply. ED is a common complication of treatments for prostate cancer, including prostatectomy and destruction of the prostate by external beam radiation, although the prostate gland itself is not necessary to achieve an erection. As far as inguinal hernia surgery is concerned, in most cases, and in the absence of postoperative complications, the operative repair can lead to a recovery of the sexual life of people with preoperative sexual dysfunction, while, in most cases, it does not affect people with a preoperative normal sexual life.

ED can also be associated with bicycling due to both neurological and vascular problems due to compression. The increased risk appears to be about 1.7-fold.

Concerns that use of pornography can cause ED have little support in epidemiological studies, according to a 2015 literature review. According to Gunter de Win, a Belgian professor and sex researcher, "Put simply, respondents who watch 60 minutes a week and think they're addicted were more likely to report sexual dysfunction than those who watch a care-free 160 minutes weekly." A 2026 review shows that simple pornography consumption does not cause erectile dysfunction, the relationship between pornography and ED being much more complex.

In seemingly rare cases, medications such as SSRIs, isotretinoin (Accutane) and finasteride (Propecia) are reported to induce long-lasting iatrogenic disorders characterized by sexual dysfunction symptoms, including erectile dysfunction in males; these disorders are known as post-SSRI sexual dysfunction (PSSD), post-retinoid sexual dysfunction/post-Accutane syndrome (PRSD/PAS), and post-finasteride syndrome (PFS). These conditions remain poorly understood and lack effective treatments, although they have been suggested to share a common etiology.

- Rarely impotence can be caused by aromatase being active. See Androgen replacement therapy.

== Pathophysiology ==
Penile erection is managed by two mechanisms: the reflex erection, which is achieved by directly touching the penile shaft, and the psychogenic erection, which is achieved by erotic or emotional stimuli. The former involves the peripheral nerves and the lower parts of the spinal cord, whereas the latter involves the limbic system of the brain. In both cases, an intact neural system is required for a successful and complete erection. Stimulation of the penile shaft by the nervous system leads to the secretion of nitric oxide (NO), which causes the relaxation of the smooth muscles of the corpora cavernosa (the main erectile tissue of the penis), and subsequently penile erection. Additionally, adequate levels of testosterone (produced by the testes) and an intact pituitary gland are required for the development of a healthy erectile system. As can be understood from the mechanisms of a normal erection, impotence may develop due to hormonal deficiency, disorders of the neural system, lack of adequate penile blood supply or psychological problems.

== Diagnosis ==
In many cases, the diagnosis can be made based on the person's history of symptoms. In other cases, a physical examination and laboratory investigations are done to rule out more serious causes such as hypogonadism or prolactinoma.

One of the first steps is to distinguish between physiological and psychological ED. Determining whether involuntary erections are present is important in eliminating the possibility of psychogenic causes for ED. Obtaining full erections occasionally, such as nocturnal penile tumescence when asleep (that is, when the mind and psychological issues, if any, are less present), tends to suggest that the physical structures are functionally working. Similarly, performance with manual stimulation, as well as any performance anxiety or acute situational ED, may indicate a psychogenic component to ED.

Another factor leading to ED is diabetes mellitus, a well known cause of neuropathy. ED is also related to generally poor physical health, poor dietary habits, obesity, and most specifically cardiovascular disease, such as coronary artery disease and peripheral vascular disease. Screening for cardiovascular risk factors, such as smoking, dyslipidemia, hypertension, and alcoholism, is helpful.

In some cases, the simple search for a previously undetected groin hernia can prove useful since it can affect sexual functions in males and is relatively easily curable.

The current – as of April 2025 – edition of the Diagnostic and Statistical Manual of Mental Disorders (DSM-5-TR) lists Erectile Disorder (ICD-10-CM code: F52.21) as a diagnosis. According to the DSM, it "is the more specific DSM-5 diagnostic category in which erectile dysfunction persists for at least 6 months and causes distress in the individual." The ICD-10, to which the DSM refers regarding Erectile dysfunction, lists it under Failure of genital response (F52.2). The latest edition of the ICD – namely, the ICD-11 – lists the condition as Male erectile dysfunction (HA01.1).

=== Ultrasonography ===
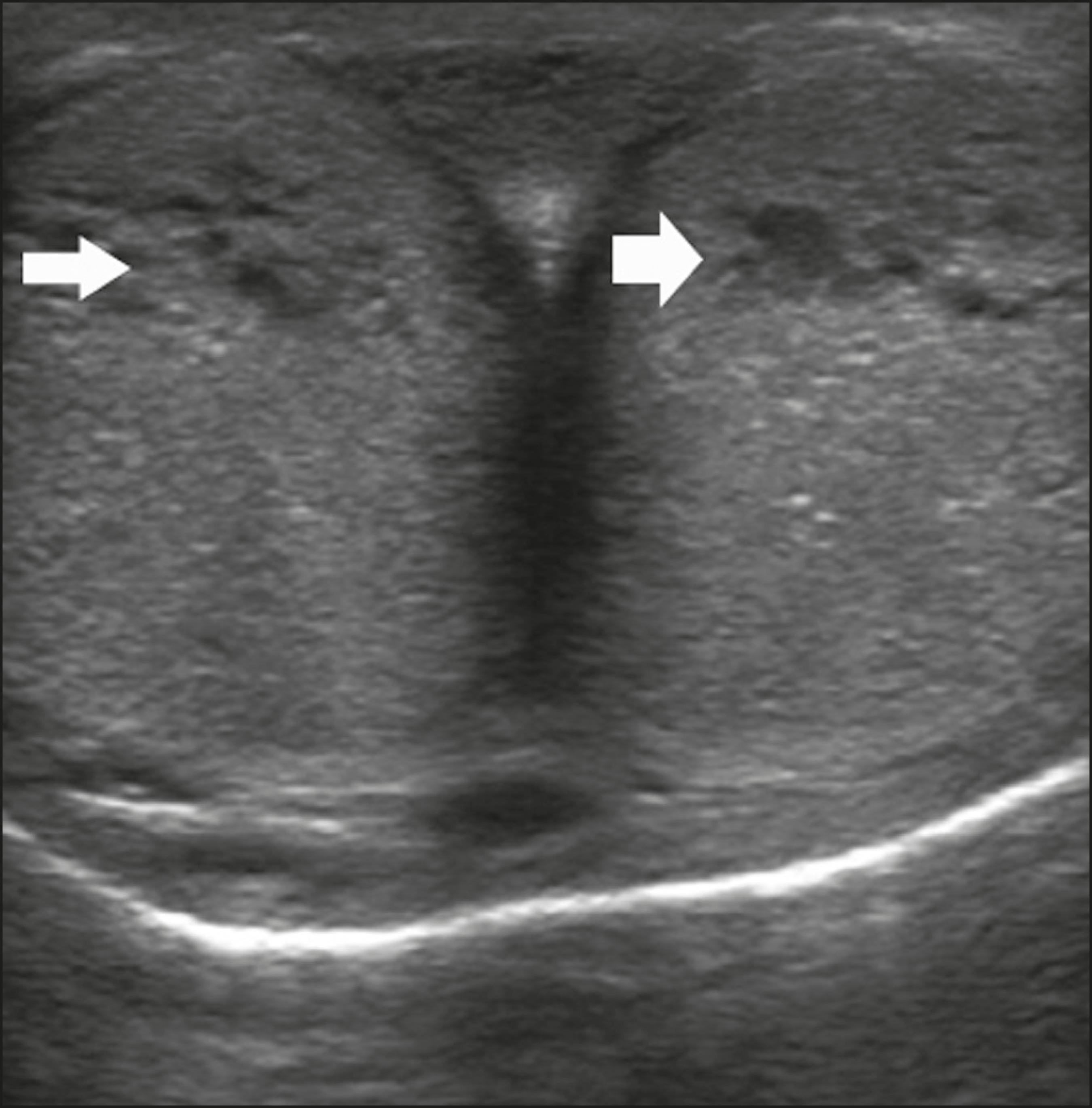
Transverse ultrasound image, ventral view of the penis. Image obtained after induction of an erection, 15 min after injection of prostaglandin E1, showing dilated sinusoids (arrows).

Penile ultrasonography with doppler can be used to examine the erect penis. Most cases of ED of organic causes are related to changes in blood flow in the corpora cavernosa, represented by occlusive artery disease (in which less blood is allowed to enter the penis), most often of atherosclerotic origin, or due to failure of the veno-occlusive mechanism (in which too much blood circulates back out of the penis). Before the Doppler sonogram, the penis should be examined in B mode, in order to identify possible tumors, fibrotic plaques, calcifications, or hematomas, and to evaluate the appearance of the cavernous arteries, which can be tortuous or atheromatous.

Erection can be induced by injecting 10–20 μg of prostaglandin E1, with evaluations of the arterial flow every five minutes for 25–30 min (see image). The use of prostaglandin E1 is contraindicated in patients with predisposition to priapism (e.g., those with sickle cell anemia), anatomical deformity of the penis, or penile implants. Phentolamine (2 mg) is often added. Visual and tactile stimulation produces better results. Some authors recommend the use of sildenafil by mouth to replace the injectable drugs in cases of contraindications, although the efficacy of such medication is controversial.

Before the injection of the chosen drug, the flow pattern is monophasic, with low systolic velocities and an absence of diastolic flow. After injection, systolic and diastolic peak velocities should increase, decreasing progressively with vein occlusion and becoming negative when the penis becomes rigid (see image below). The reference values vary across studies, ranging from > 25 cm/s to > 35 cm/s. Values above 35 cm/s indicate the absence of arterial disease, values below 25 cm/s indicate arterial insufficiency, and values of 25–35 cm/s are indeterminate because they are less specific (see image below). The data obtained should be correlated with the degree of erection observed. If the peak systolic velocities are normal, the final diastolic velocities should be evaluated, those above 5 cm/s being associated with venogenic ED.

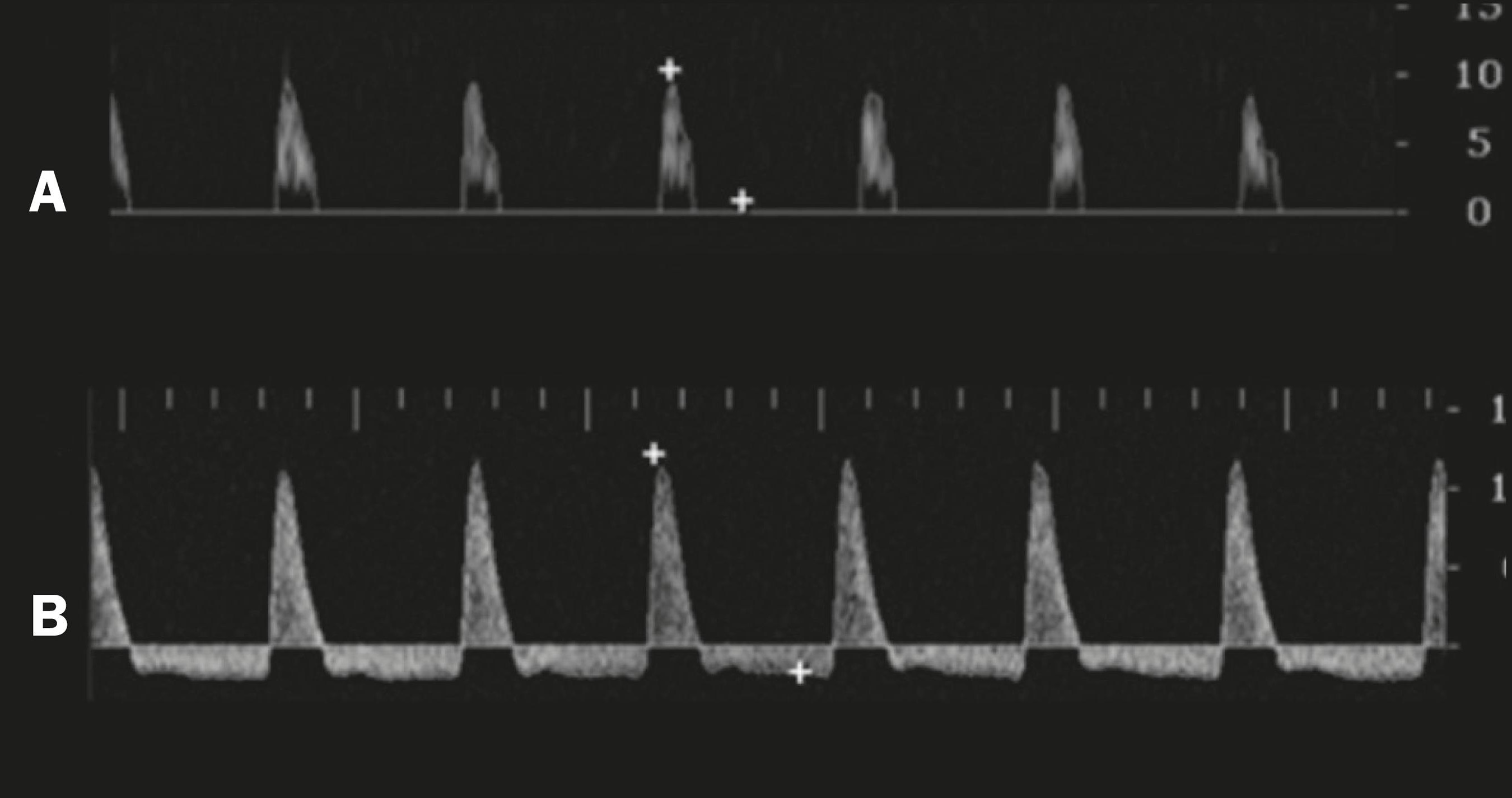
Graphs representing the color Doppler spectrum of the flow pattern of the cavernous arteries during the erection phases. A: Single-phase flow with minimal or absent diastole when the penis is flaccid. B: Increased systolic flow and reverse diastole 25 min after injection of prostaglandin.

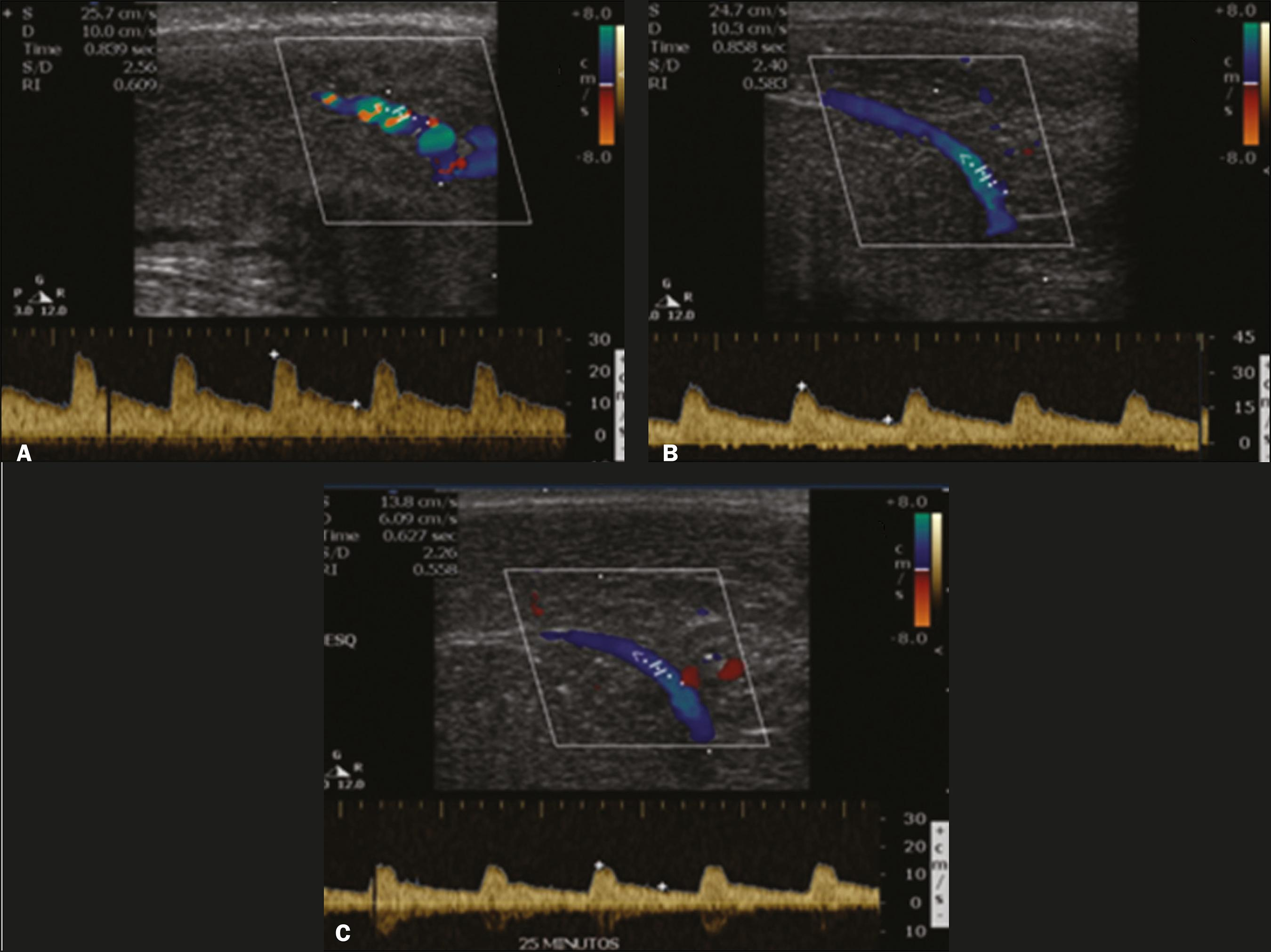
Longitudinal, ventral ultrasound of the penis, with pulsed mode and color Doppler. Flow of the cavernous arteries at 5, 15, and 25 min after prostaglandin injection (A, B, and C, respectively). The cavernous artery flow remains below the expected levels (at least 25–35 cm/s), which indicates ED due to arterial insufficiency.

=== Other workup methods ===
Penile nerves function
Tests such as the bulbocavernosus reflex test are used to ascertain whether there is enough nerve sensation in the penis. The physician squeezes the glans (head) of the penis, which immediately causes the anus to contract if nerve function is normal. A physician measures the latency between squeeze and contraction by observing the anal sphincter or by feeling it with a gloved finger in the anus.

Nocturnal penile tumescence (NPT)
It is normal for a man to have five to six erections during sleep, especially during rapid eye movement (REM). Their absence may indicate a problem with nerve function or blood supply in the penis. There are two methods for measuring changes in penile rigidity and circumference during nocturnal erection: snap gauge and strain gauge. A significant proportion of males who have no sexual dysfunction nonetheless do not have regular nocturnal erections.

Penile biothesiometry
This test uses electromagnetic vibration to evaluate sensitivity and nerve function in the glans and shaft of the penis.

Dynamic infusion cavernosometry (DICC)
Technique in which fluid is pumped into the penis at a known rate and pressure. It gives a measurement of the vascular pressure in the corpus cavernosum during an erection.

Corpus cavernosometry
Cavernosography measurement of the vascular pressure in the corpus cavernosum. Saline is infused under pressure into the corpus cavernosum with a butterfly needle, and the flow rate needed to maintain an erection indicates the degree of venous leakage. The leaking veins responsible may be visualized by infusing a mixture of saline and x-ray contrast medium and performing a cavernosogram. In Digital Subtraction Angiography (DSA), the images are acquired digitally.

Magnetic resonance angiography (MRA)
This is similar to magnetic resonance imaging. Magnetic resonance angiography uses magnetic fields and radio waves to provide detailed images of the blood vessels. The doctor may inject into the patient's bloodstream a contrast agent, which causes vascular tissues to stand out against other tissues, so that information about blood supply and vascular anomalies is easier to gather.

Erection Hardness Score

The Erection Hardness Score (EHS) is a single-item Likert scale used to assess the subjective hardness of the penis as reported by the patient. It ranges from 0 (indicating the penis does not enlarge) to 4 (indicating the penis is completely hard and fully rigid). Developed in 1998, the EHS is widely used in clinical trials and is recognized for its ease of administration and strong association with sexual function outcomes. It has been validated across various causes of erectile dysfunction and in patients treated with phosphodiesterase type 5 inhibitors (PDE5), showing robust psychometric properties and responsiveness to treatment.

== Treatment ==
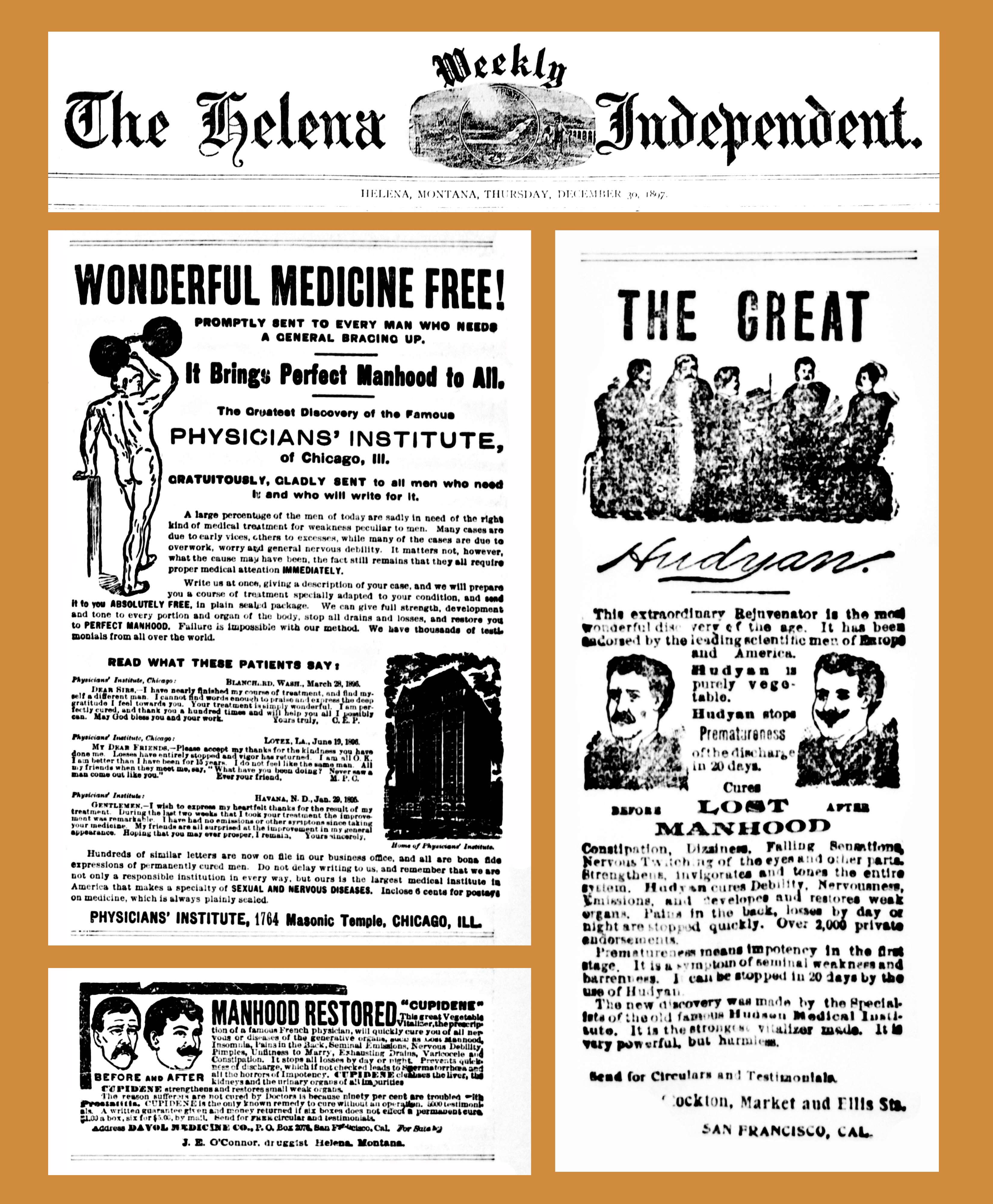
One ad from 1897 claims to restore "perfect manhood. Failure is impossible with our method". Another "will quickly cure you of all nervous or diseases of the generative organs, such as Lost Manhood, Insomnia, Pains in the Back, Seminal Emissions, Nervous Debility, Pimples, Unfitness to Marry, Exhausting Drains, Varicocele and Constipation". The U.S. Federal Trade Commission warns that "phony cures" exist even today.

Treatment depends on the underlying cause. In general, exercise, particularly of the aerobic type, is effective for preventing ED during midlife. Counseling can be used if the underlying cause is psychological, including how to lower stress or anxiety related to sex. Medications by mouth and vacuum erection devices are first-line treatments, followed by injections of drugs into the penis, as well as penile implants. Vascular reconstructive surgeries are beneficial in certain groups. Treatments, other than surgery, do not fix the underlying physiological problem, but are used as needed before sex.

=== Medications ===
The PDE5 inhibitors sildenafil (Viagra), vardenafil (Levitra) and tadalafil (Cialis) are prescription drugs which are taken by mouth. As of 2018, sildenafil is available in the UK without a prescription. Additionally, a cream combining alprostadil with the permeation enhancer DDAIP has been approved in Canada as a first line treatment for ED. Penile injections, on the other hand, can involve one of the following medications: papaverine, phentolamine, and prostaglandin E1, also known as alprostadil. In addition to injections, there is an alprostadil suppository that can be inserted into the urethra. Once inserted, an erection can begin within 10 minutes and last up to an hour. Medications to treat ED may cause a side effect called priapism.

==== Prevalence of medical diagnosis ====
In a study published in 2016, based on US health insurance claims data, out of 19,833,939 US males aged ≥18 years, only 1,108,842 (5.6%), were medically diagnosed with erectile dysfunction or on a PDE5I prescription (μ age 55.2 years, σ 11.2 years). Prevalence of diagnosis or prescription was the highest for age group 60–69 at 11.5%, lowest for age group 18–29 at 0.4%, and 2.1% for 30–39, 5.7% for 40–49, 10% for 50–59, 11% for 70–79, 4.6% for 80–89, 0.9% for ≥90, respectively.

=== Focused shockwave therapy ===
Focused shockwave therapy involves passing short, high frequency acoustic pulses through the skin and into the penis. These waves break down any plaques within the blood vessels, encourage the formation of new vessels, and stimulate repair and tissue regeneration.

Focused shockwave therapy appears to work best for males with vasculogenic ED, which is a blood vessel disorder that affects blood flow to tissue in the penis. The treatment is painless and has no known side effects. Treatment with shockwave therapy can lead to a significant improvement of the IIEF (International Index of Erectile Function).

=== Testosterone ===
Men with low levels of testosterone can experience ED. Taking testosterone may help maintain an erection. Males with type 2 diabetes are twice as likely to have lower levels of testosterone, and are three times more likely to experience ED than non-diabetic men.

=== Pumps ===
A vacuum erection device helps draw blood into the penis by applying negative pressure. This type of device is sometimes referred to as penis pump and may be used just prior to sexual intercourse. Several types of FDA approved vacuum therapy devices are available under prescription. When pharmacological methods fail, a purpose-designed external vacuum pump can be used to attain erection, with a separate compression ring fitted to the base of the penis to maintain it. These pumps should be distinguished from other penis pumps (supplied without compression rings) which, rather than being used for temporary treatment of impotence, are claimed to increase penis length if used frequently, or vibrate as an aid to masturbation. More drastically, inflatable or rigid penile implants may be fitted surgically.

=== Vibrators ===
The vibrator was invented in the late 19th century as a medical instrument for pain relief and the treatment of various ailments. Sometimes described as a massager, the vibrator is used on the body to produce sexual stimulation. Several clinical studies have found vibrators to be an effective solution for Erectile Dysfunction. Examples of FDA registered vibrators for erectile dysfunction include MV.Health's Tenuto and Reflexonic's Viberect.

=== Surgery ===
Often, as a last resort, if other treatments have failed, the most common procedure is prosthetic implants which involves the insertion of artificial rods into the penis. Some sources show that vascular reconstructive surgeries are viable options for some people.

=== Topical Gel ===
In June 2023, The U.S. Food and Drug Administration (FDA) authorized for marketing Eroxon, an over-the-counter non-medicated hydro-alcoholic gel indicated for treatment of erectile dysfunction. In the clinical trial, erection was achieved by most men within ten minutes after applying the gel. The gel is manufactured by Futura Medical, a British medical company. The gel is regulated as a medical device and not as a drug, because its mode of action is a physical one and it doesn't have an active pharmaceutical ingredient.

Eroxon is the first topical ED treatment sold over the counter in the United States. The gel had been on sale in Europe under a CE mark since 2023, and it reached American shops in October 2024.

As of 2026, the gel is sold in the United States, United Kingdom, Europe, and several countries in Latin America and the Middle East.

=== Alternative medicine ===
The Food and Drug Administration (FDA) does not recommend alternative therapies to treat sexual dysfunction. Many products are advertised as "herbal viagra" or "natural" sexual enhancement products, but no clinical trials or scientific studies support the effectiveness of these products for the treatment of ED, and synthetic chemical compounds similar to sildenafil have been found as adulterants in many of these products. The FDA has warned consumers that any sexual enhancement product that claims to work as well as prescription products is likely to contain such a contaminant. A 2021 review indicated that ginseng had "only trivial effects on erectile function or satisfaction with intercourse compared to placebo".

== History ==
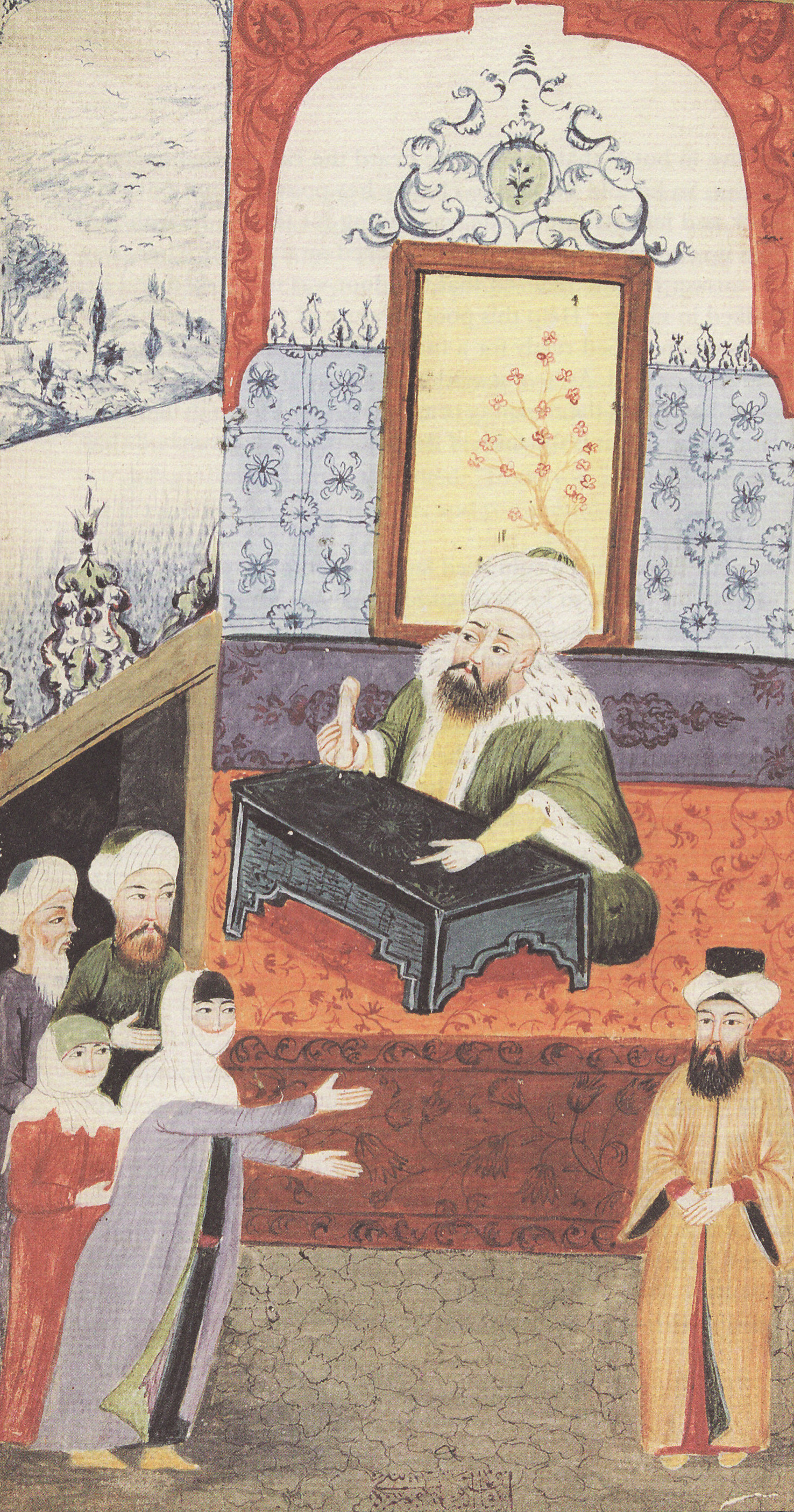
An unhappy wife is complaining to the qadi about her husband's impotence. Ottoman miniature.

Attempts to treat the symptoms described by ED date back well over 1,000 years. In the 8th century, males of Ancient Rome and Greece wore talismans of rooster and goat genitalia, believing these talismans would serve as an aphrodisiac and promote sexual function. In the 13th century, Albertus Magnus recommended ingesting roasted wolf penis as a remedy for impotence. During the late 16th and 17th centuries in France, male impotence was considered a crime, as well as legal grounds for a divorce. The practice, which involved inspection of the complainants by court experts, was declared obscene in 1677.

The first major publication describing a broad medicalization of sexual disorders was the first edition of the Diagnostic and Statistical Manual of Mental Disorders in 1952. In the early 20th century, medical folklore held that 90-95% of cases of ED were psychological in origin, but around the 1980s research took the opposite direction of searching for physical causes of sexual dysfunction, which also happened in the 1920s and 30s. Physical causes as explanations continue to dominate literature when compared with psychological explanations as of 2022.

Treatments in the 80s for ED included penile implants and intracavernosal injections. The first successful vacuum erection device, or penis pump, was developed by Vincent Marie Mondat in the early 1800s. A more advanced device based on a bicycle pump was developed by Geddings Osbon, a Pentecostal preacher, in the 1970s. In 1982, he received FDA approval to market the product. John R. Brinkley initiated a boom in male impotence treatments in the U.S. in the 1920s and 1930s, with radio programs that recommended expensive goat gland implants and "mercurochrome" injections as the path to restored male virility, including operations by surgeon Serge Voronoff.

Modern drug therapy for ED made a significant advance in 1983, when British physiologist Giles Brindley dropped his trousers and demonstrated to a shocked Urodynamics Society audience showing his papaverine-induced erection. The current most common treatment for ED, the oral PDE5 inhibitor known as sildenafil (Viagra) was approved for use for Pfizer by the FDA in 1998, which at the time of release was the fastest selling drug in history. Sildenafil largely replaced SSRI treatments for ED at the time and proliferated new types of specialised pharmaceutical marketing which emphasised social connotations of ED and Viagra rather than its physical effects.

== Anthropology ==
Anthropological research presents ED not as a disorder but, as a normal, and sometimes even welcome sign of healthy aging. Wentzell's study of 250 Mexican males in their 50s and 60s found that "most simply did not see decreasing erectile function as a biological pathology". The males interviewed described the decrease in erectile function "as an aid for aging in socially appropriate ways". A common theme amongst the interviewees showed that respectable older males shifted their focus toward the domestic sphere into a "second stage of life". The Mexican males of this generation often pursued sex outside of marriage; decreasing erectile function acted as an aid to overcoming infidelity thus helping to attain the ideal "second stage" of life. A 56-year-old about to retire from the public health service said he would now "dedicate myself to my wife, the house, gardening, caring for the grandchildren—the Mexican classic". Wentzell found that treating ED as a pathology was antithetical to the social view these males held of themselves, and their purpose at this stage of their lives.

In the 20th and 21st centuries, anthropologists investigated how common treatments for ED are built upon assumptions of institutionalized social norms. In offering a range of clinical treatments to 'correct' a person's ability to produce an erection, biomedical institutions encourage the public to strive for prolonged sexual function. Anthropologists argue that a biomedical focus places emphasis on the biological processes of fixing the body thereby disregarding holistic ideals of health and aging. By relying on a wholly medical approach, Western biomedicine can become blindsided by bodily dysfunctions which can be understood as appropriate functions of age, and not as a medical problem. Anthropologists understand that a biosocial approach to ED considers a person's decision to undergo clinical treatment more likely a result of "society, political economy, history, and culture" than a matter of personal choice. In rejecting biomedical treatment for ED, males can challenge common forms of medicalized social control by deviating from what is considered the normal approach to dysfunction.

== Lexicology ==
The Latin term impotentia coeundi describes simple inability to insert the penis into the vagina; it is now mostly replaced by more precise terms, such as erectile dysfunction (ED). The study of ED within medicine is covered by andrology, a sub-field within urology. Research indicates that ED is common, and it is suggested that approximately 40% of males experience symptoms compatible with ED, at least occasionally. The condition is also on occasion called phallic impotence. Its antonym, or opposite condition, is priapism.
