= Penis pump =

Sex toy

The penis pump is a vacuum pump that is used as an aid in cases of impotence, that is, when sufficient rigidity of the organ for engaging in sexual intercourse cannot be achieved naturally. The penis pump is a possible alternative to medicinal treatment with potency drugs or the implantation of a penile prosthesis.

The pump is placed over the penis and, by pumping, creates a vacuum that causes the organ to become rigid. By applying an elastic penis ring at the base of the penis after the required rigidity has been achieved and after removing the pump, the erection is maintained for a period of time. In Germany, statutory health insurance covers the cost of a penis pump if erectile dysfunction has been medically diagnosed. In this case, the doctor can prescribe the pump as a medical aid by prescription. In addition to their function as a medical aid, penis pumps are also used for masturbation and for erotic games, for example in cock and ball torture, even when the partner does not have potency problems.

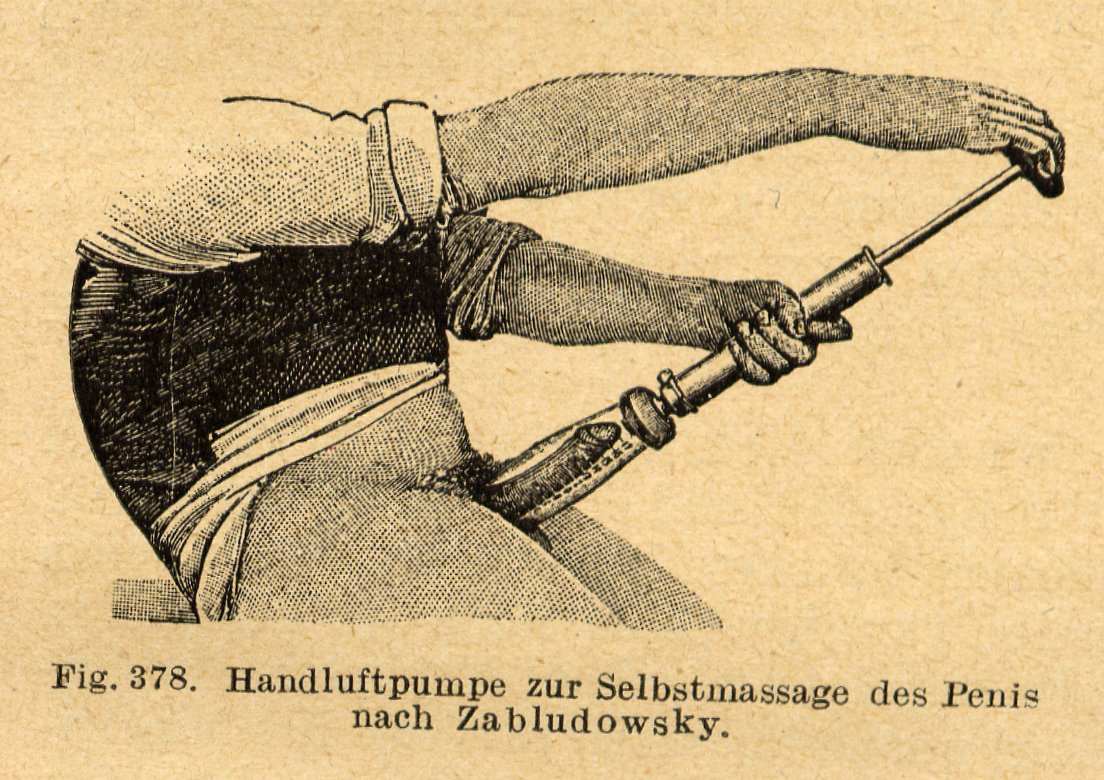
Penis pump from the early 20th century

Devices operating according to the principle of a penis pump are also marketed as an alleged means of permanent penis enlargement. Their effectiveness has not been scientifically proven. There is also a risk of hematomas and tissue damage if excessive vacuum pressure is applied.

== Literature ==
- Mary Roach: BONK. Everything About Sex – Researched by Science, Fischer Taschenbuch Verlag, 2nd edition, 2009, ISBN 978-3-5961-8229-9.
