= Penile implant =

Medical device

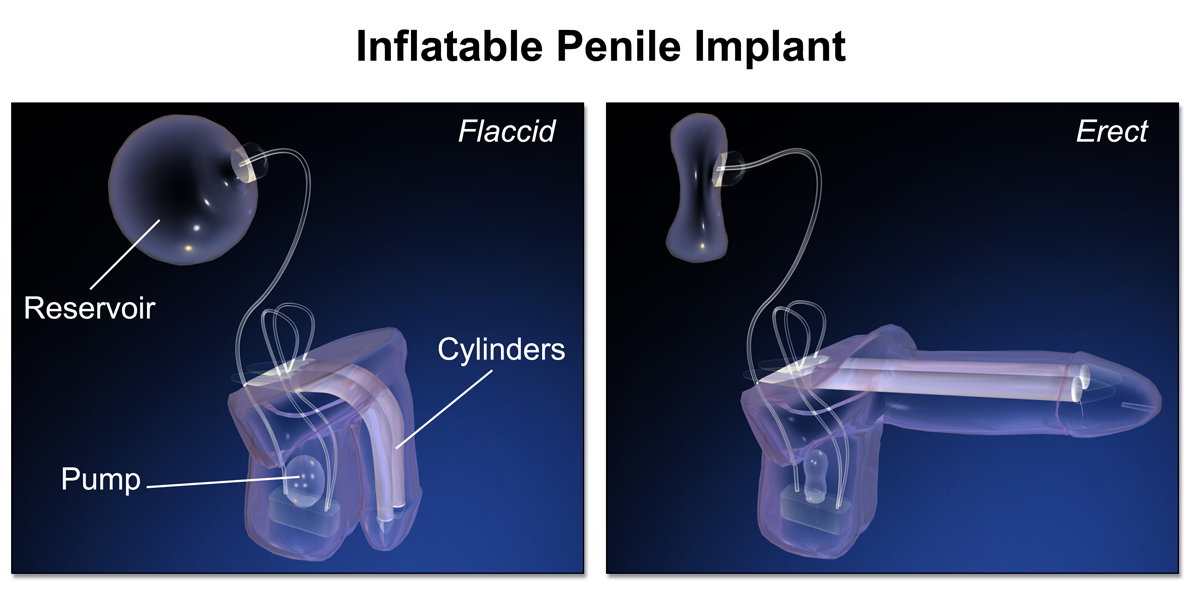
- Other names: Penile prosthesis
- Specialty: Urology
- ICD-10-PCS: 0VUS0JZ
- CPT: 54400, 54405

A penile implant is an implanted device intended for the treatment of erectile dysfunction, Peyronie's disease, ischemic priapism, deformity and any traumatic injury of the penis, and for phalloplasty or metoidioplasty, including in gender-affirming surgery. Men also opt for penile implants for aesthetic purposes. Men's satisfaction and sexual function is influenced by discomfort over genital size, which leads some to seek surgical and non-surgical solutions for penis alteration. Although there are many distinct types of implants, most fall into one of two categories: malleable and inflatable transplants.

== History ==
The first modern prosthetic reconstruction of a penis is attributed to NA Borgus, a German physician who performed the first surgical attempts in 1936 on soldiers with traumatic amputations of the penis. He used rib cartilages as prosthetic material and reconstructed the genitals for both micturition and intercourse purposes. Willard E. Goodwin and William Wallace Scott were the first to describe the placement of synthetic penile implants using acrylic prosthesis in 1952. Silicone-based penile implants were developed by Harvey Lash and the first case series were published in 1964. The development of a high-grade silicone that is currently used in penile implants is credited to NASA. The prototypes of the contemporary inflatable and malleable penile implants were presented in 1973 during the annual meeting of the American Urological Association by two groups of physicians from Baylor University (Gerald Timm, William E. Bradley and F. Brantley Scott) and University of Miami (Michael P. Small and Hernan M. Carrion). Small and Carrion pioneered the popularization of semi-rigid penile implants with the introduction of Small-Carrion prosthesis (Mentor, USA) in 1975. Brantley Scott described the initial device as composed of two inflatable cylindrical bodies made up of silicone, a reservoir containing radiopaque fluid and two pumping units. The first generation products were marketed through American Medical Systems (AMS; currently Boston Scientific), with which Brantley Scott was associated. Many device updates have been released by AMS since the first generation implants. In 1983, Mentor (currently Coloplast) joined the market. In 2017, there were more than ten manufacturers of penile implants in the world, however only a few now remain in the market. The latest additions to the market are Zephyr Surgical Implants and Rigicon Innovative Urological Solutions. Zephyr Surgical Implants, along with penile implants for biological males, introduced the first line of inflatable and malleable penile implants designed for sex reassignment for trans men. In recent years, Rigicon Innovative Urological Solutions, a US-based company, has made significant advancements in the field of penile implants. In 2017, they released the 'Rigi10,' a malleable implant that expanded the market's options. Following this, in 2019, they introduced both the 'Infla10' series, which includes the Infla10 AX, Infla10 X, and Infla10 models, and the 'Rigi10 Hydrophilic.' These inflatable and hydrophilic-coated malleable models respectively were important additions to the range of penile implant technologies available. These advancements have contributed to the diversity and progress in the development of penile implants, offering patients more varied and tailored treatment solutions.

According to analysis of the 5% Medicare Public Use Files from 2001 to 2010 approximately 3% of patients diagnosed with erectile dysfunction opt for penile implantation. Each year nearly 25,000 inflatable penile prostheses are implanted in the USA.

The list shows penile implants available in the market in 2020.

Product	Company	Country of origin	Type of the implant	Introduced in
AMS Spectra	Boston Scientific (formerly American Medical Systems)	United States of America	Malleable	2009
Tactra	Boston Scientific (formerly American Medical Systems)	United States of America	Malleable	2019
Genesis	Coloplast	United States of America	Malleable	2004
Shah Indian Malleable	Dr.Rupin Shah	India	Malleable	2008
ZSI 100, ZSI 100 FtM and ZSI 100 D4	Zephyr Surgical Implants	Switzerland	Malleable	2012
Tube	Promedon	Argentina	Malleable	2007
AMS Ambicor	Boston Scientific (formerly American Medical Systems)	United States of America	Inflatable	1994
AMS 700 series (LGX, CX, CXR)	Boston Scientific (formerly American Medical Systems)	United States of America	Inflatable	1983
Titan	Coloplast	United States of America	Inflatable	2002
ZSI 475 and ZSI 475 FtM	Zephyr Surgical Implants	Switzerland	Inflatable	2012
Infla10 series (AX, X, NarrowBody)	Rigicon Innovative Urological Solutions	United States of America	Inflatable	2019
Rigi10	Rigicon Innovative Urological Solutions	United States of America	Malleable	2017
Rigi10 Hydrophilic	Rigicon Innovative Urological Solutions	United States of America	Malleable	2019

== Types ==
=== Malleable penile implant ===
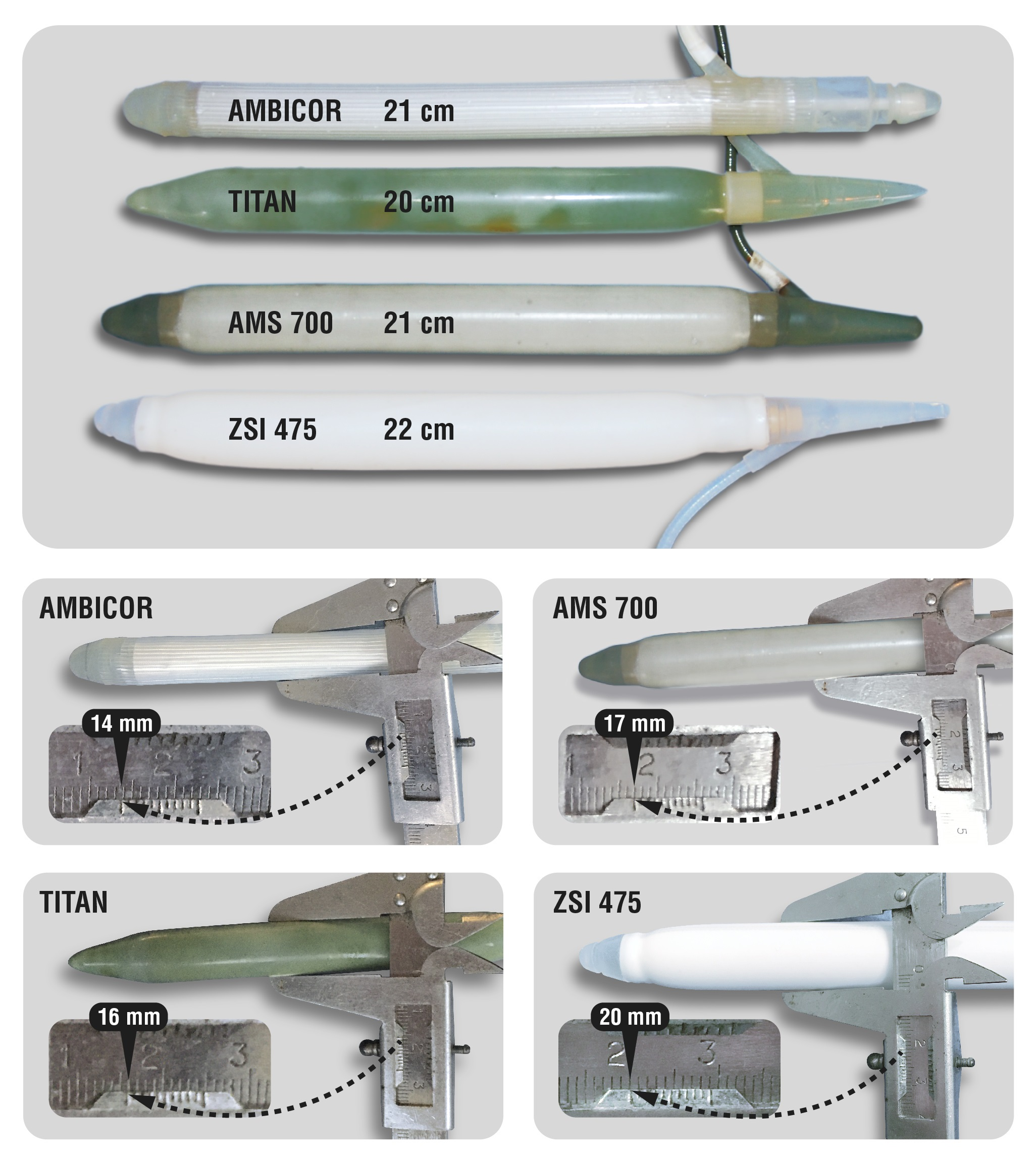
Comparison of penile implants (inflated cylinder diameter and length)

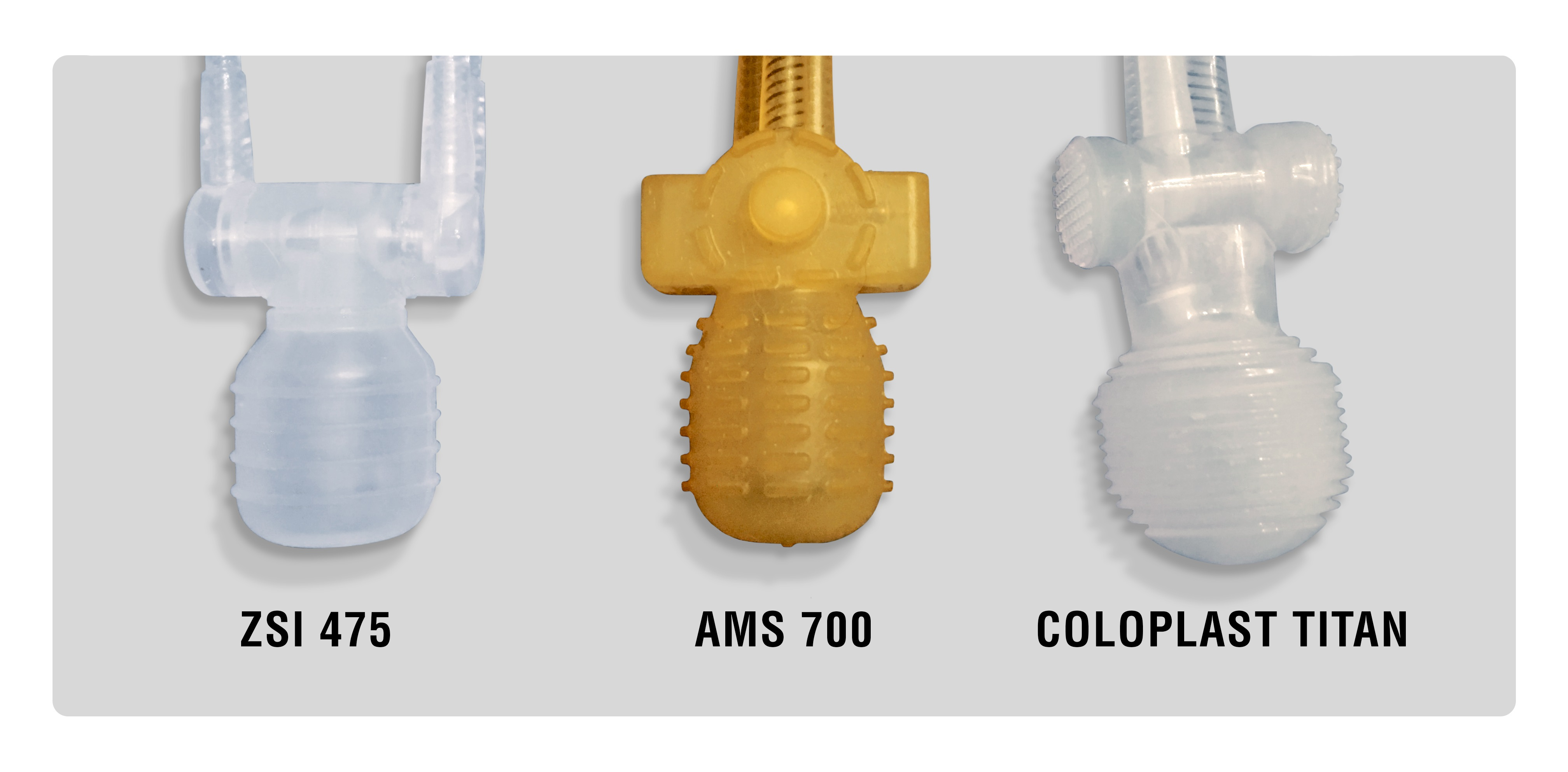
Penile implant pump design comparison

The malleable (also known as non-inflatable or semi-rigid) penile prosthesis is a pair of rods implanted into the corpora of the penis. The rods are hard, but 'malleable' in the sense that they can be adjusted manually into the erect position. There are two types of malleable implants: one that is made of silicone and does not have a rod inside, also called soft implants, and another with a silver or steel spiral wire core inside coated with silicone. Some of the models have trimmable tails intended for length adjustment. Currently, a variety of malleable penile implants are available worldwide.

=== Inflatable penile implant ===
The inflatable penile implant (IPP), more recently developed, is a set of inflatable cylinders and a pump system. Based on the differences in structure, there are two types of inflatable penile implants: two-piece and three-piece IPPs. Both types of inflatable devices are filled with sterile saline solution which is pumped into cylinders when in process. The cylinders are implanted into the cavernous body of the penis. The pump system is attached to the cylinders and placed in the scrotum. Three-piece implants have a separate large reservoir connected to the pump. The reservoir is commonly placed in the retropubic space (Retzius' space), however other locations have also been described, such as between the transverse muscle and rectus muscle. Three-piece implants provide more desirable rigidity and girth of the penis resembling natural erection. Additionally, due to the presence of a large reservoir, three-piece implants provide full flaccidity of the penis when deflated, thus bringing more comfort than two-piece inflatable and malleable implants.

The saline solution is pumped manually from the reservoir into bilateral chambers of cylinders implanted in the shaft of the penis, which replaces the non- or minimally-functioning erectile tissue. This produces an erection. The glans of the penis, however, remains unaffected. Ninety to ninety-five percent of inflatable prostheses produce erections suitable for sexual intercourse. In the United States, the inflatable prosthesis has largely replaced the malleable one, due to its lower rate of infections, high device survival rate and 80–90% satisfaction rate.

The first IPP prototype presented in 1975 by Scott and colleagues was a three-piece prosthesis (two cylinders, two pumps and a fluid reservoir). Since then, the IPP has undergone multiple modifications and improvements for device reliability and durability, including change in the chemical material used in implant manufacturing, using hydrophilic and antibiotic eluting coatings to reduce the rates of infections, introducing one-touch release etc. Surgical techniques used for the implantation of penile prostheses have also improved along with evolution of the device. Inflatable penile implants were one of the first interventions in urology where the "no-touch" surgical technique was introduced. This has significantly reduced the rates of post-operative infections.

== Medical use ==
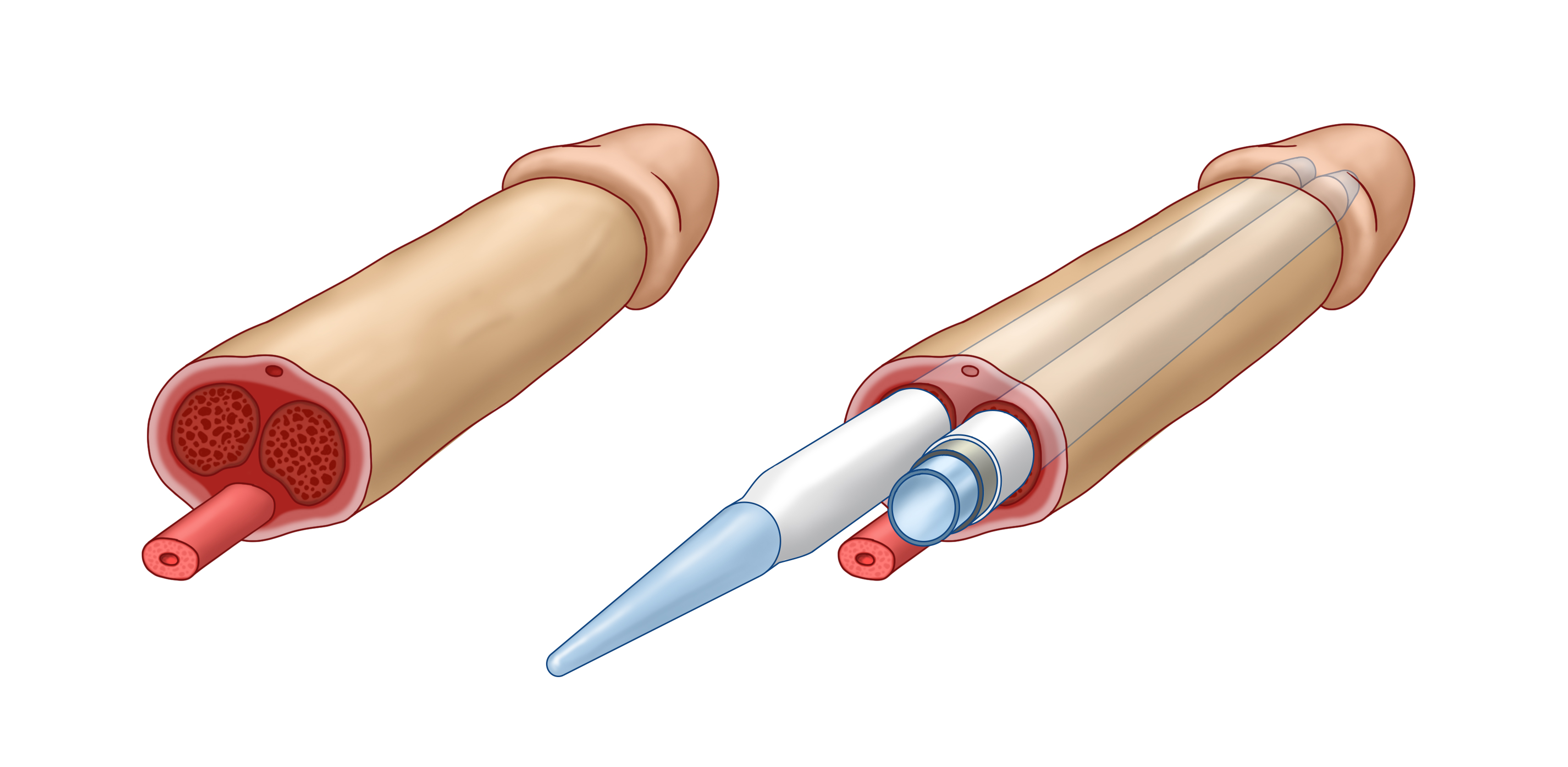
A diagram of an inflatable penile implant inserted into corpus cavernosum of the penis

Evoking an erection with an implanted penile implant

=== Erectile dysfunction ===
In spite of recent rapid and extensive development of non-surgical management options for erectile dysfunction, especially novel targeted medications and gene therapy, the penile implants remain the mainstay and the gold standard choice for the treatment of erectile dysfunction refractory to oral medications and injectable therapy. Additionally, penile implants can be a relevant option for those with erectile dysfunction who want to proceed with a permanent solution without medical therapy. Penile implants have been used for the treatment of erectile dysfunction with various etiologies, including vascular, cavernosal, neurogenic, psychological and post-surgical (e.g. prostatectomy). The American Urological Association recommends informing all men with erectile dysfunction about penile implants as a choice of treatment and discussing the potential outcomes with them.

Penile implants can also be used in people with spinal cord injury.

=== Penile deformity ===
Penile implants can help recover the natural shape of the penis in various conditions that have led to penile deformity. These can be traumatic injuries, penile surgeries, disfiguring and fibrosing diseases of the penis, such as Peyronie's disease. In Peyronie's disease, the change in penile curvature affects normal sexual intercourse as well as causing erectile dysfunction due to disruption of blood flow in the cavernous bodies of the penis. Therefore, implantation of penile prosthesis in Peyronie's disease addresses several mechanisms involved in the pathophysiology of the disease.

=== Female-to-male sex reassignment ===
Although different models of penile prostheses have been reported to be implanted after phalloplasty procedures, with the first case described in 1978 by Pucket and Montie, the first penile implants designed and produced specifically for female-to-male gender reassignment surgery for trans men were introduced in 2015 by Zephyr Surgical Implants. Both malleable and inflatable models are available. These implants have more realistic shape with an ergonomic glans at the tip of the prosthesis. The inflatable model has an attached pump resembling a testicle. The prosthesis is implanted with a sturdy fixation on pubic bone. Another, thinner malleable implant is intended for metoidioplasty.

== Outcomes ==
=== Satisfaction ===
The overall satisfaction rate with penile implants reaches over 90%. Both self- and partner-reported satisfaction rates are evaluated to assess the outcomes. It has been shown that implantation of inflatable penile prosthesis brings more patient and partner satisfaction than medication therapy with PDE5 inhibitors or intracavernosal injections. Satisfaction rates are reported to be higher with inflatable rather than malleable implants, but there are no differences between two-piece and three-piece devices. The most frequent reasons for dissatisfaction are reduced penis length and girth, failed expectations and difficulties with device use. Thus, it is vital to provide patients and their partners with detailed preoperative counselling and instructions.

=== Curvature correction ===
33% to 90% of cases of patients with Peyronie's disease that have had an inflatable PI procedure have successfully corrected their penile deformity. The residual curvature after penile implant placement usually requires intraoperative surgical intervention.

=== Progress in procedure ===
Dilation of the corpora cavernosa, typically with Hegar sounds, before inserting the device has been a common part of implantation procedures. This dilation destroys erectile tissue. It has been shown that a tissue-sparing technique, i.e. without dilation, correlates with superior outcomes – some remaining natural erectile response can be preserved, and post-operative pain is reduced as well.

== Surgical method ==
As penile prosthesis surgery has developed over the last several decades and as the three-piece inflatable penile implant has become the preferred method for many dedicated implanters, two primary methods have become the standard in minimally invasive surgery: the infrapubic and the penoscrotal approaches.

The penoscrotal approach is performed via an incision between the penis and scrotum, and provides a more direct placement of penile implant reservoirs in the scrotal pouch.

The infrapubic approach involves placing the prosthesis through a small incision above the base of the penis. This method has a significantly shorter recovery time for patients, with some reporting the ability to resume sexual activity within three weeks of placement.

While there is some disagreement between urologic surgeons as to which approach is better, both methods have high success and patient satisfaction rates in excess of 80 percent.

== Complications ==
The most common complication associated with penile implant placement appears to be infections with reported rates of 1–3%. Both surgical site and device infections are reported. When the infection involves the penile implant itself, implant removal is required and irrigation of the cavities with antiseptic solutions. In this scenario, placement of a new implant is needed to avoid further tissue fibrosis and shortening of the penis. The rate of repeat surgeries or device replacements ranges from 6% to 13%. Other reported complications include perforation of the corpus cavernosum and urethra (0.1–3%), commonly occurring in patients with previous fibrosis, prosthesis erosion or extrusion, change in glans shape, hematoma, shortening of penis length, and device malfunction. Due to continuous improvement of surgical techniques and modifications of implants, complication rates have dramatically decreased over time.

To overcome post-operative penile shortening and to increase the perceived length of the penis and patient satisfaction, ventral and dorsal phalloplasty procedures in combination with penile implants have been described. Modified glanulopexy has been proposed to prevent supersonic transporter deformity and glandular hypermobility which are possible complications of penile implants.

Sliding techniques in which the penis is cut and elongated with penile implants have been performed in cases of severe penile shortening. However, these techniques had higher rates of complications and are currently avoided. Modern penile implant techniques are also widely practiced in the Middle East, including Jordan, where specialized urology centers offer both inflatable and malleable prostheses.
