= Intersex medical interventions =

Performed to modify atypical or ambiguous genitalia

A map of countries who have banned intersex infant surgery

Intersex medical interventions (IMI), sometimes known as intersex genital mutilations (IGM), are surgical, hormonal and other medical interventions performed to modify atypical or ambiguous genitalia and other sex characteristics. These interventions are performed primarily to create a more typical bodily appearance or to reduce future problems such as risk of cancer. The history of intersex surgery has been marked by debate because some reports have associated certain procedures to changes in sensation, sexual function, and long term health concerns. Additionally, non-consensual surgery or stigmas surrounding intersex individuals may lead to feelings of dysphoria and negative mental health outcomes.

Interventions on intersex infants and children are increasingly recognized as human rights issues. Intersex organizations, and human rights institutions increasingly question the basis and necessity of such interventions. In 2011, Christiane Völling won the first successful case brought against a surgeon for non-consensual surgical intervention. In 2015, the Council of Europe recognized, for the first time, a right for intersex persons not to undergo sex-assignment treatment and Malta became the first country to prohibit involuntary or coerced modifications to sex characteristics.

== Purposes of genital reconstructive surgery ==
The goals of surgery vary with the type of intersex condition, with some being medically necessary while others are cosmetic. Rationales usually include one or more of the following:

Physical health rationales:

- to improve the potential for fertility
- to provide an outlet for menstruation
- to prevent or reduce urinary tract infections or obstruction
- to reduce risk of cancer in gonads with high risk levels
- to close open wounds or exposed internal organs
- to improve urinary or fecal continence.

Psychosocial rationales:

- to alleviate parental distress over the atypical genital appearance.
- to make the appearance more normal for the person's sex of rearing
- to reduce effects of atypical genitalia on psychosexual development and gender identity
- to improve the potential for adult sexual relationships

Intersex organizations tend to criticize surgeries that are performed primarily for aesthetic reasons rather than medical necessity, with Organization Intersex International Europe referring to them as intersex genital mutilation. InterACT is also against non-consentual intersex surgeries, though it defines these surgeries as "non-lifesaving procedures to change natural variations in genital appearance or reproductive anatomy" and not procedures vital for an intersex person's health. Since most of these unnecessary surgeries are performed on children under the age of two, InterACT advocates for waiting until the child is old enough to decide what they want for their body.

Rationales for intersex medical interventions are subject to scrutiny, particularly as the consequences of surgical interventions are lifelong and irreversible. Questions regarding physical health include accurately assessing risk levels, necessity and timing. Cancer risk as a surgical justification has declined. Most intersex variations pose a low cancer risk. Monitoring gonads for cancer instead of removing them has been recommended since the mid 2000s. Psychosocial rationales have been debated because they often involve concerns from parents, society, and culture. There remains no clinical consensus or clear evidence regarding surgical timing, necessity, type of surgical intervention, degree of difference warranting intervention and evaluation method. Such surgeries are still widely discussed, including community activism, and multiple reports by international human rights and health institutions and national ethics bodies.

== Types of intervention ==
Interventions include:

- surgical treatment
- hormone treatment
- genetic selection and terminations

Surgical interventions can broadly be divided into masculinizing surgical procedures intended to make genitalia more like those of typical XY-males, and feminizing surgical procedures intended to make genitalia more like those of typical XX-females. There are multiple techniques or approaches for each procedure. Some of these are needed for variations in degrees of physical difference. Techniques and procedure have evolved over the last 60 years. Some of the different techniques have been devised to reduce complications associated with earlier techniques. There remains a lack of consensus on surgeries, and some clinicians have stated that some procedures lack sufficient supporting evidence.

Some children receive a combination of procedures. For example, a child regarded as a severely undervirilized boy with a pseudovaginal perineoscrotal hypospadias may have midline urogenital closure, third degree hypospadias repair, chordee release and phalloplasty, and orchiopexy performed. A child regarded as a severely virilized girl with congenital adrenal hyperplasia (CAH) may undergo both a partial clitoral recession and a vaginoplasty.

=== Masculinizing surgical procedures ===
Orchiopexy and hypospadias repair are the most common types of genital corrective surgery performed in infant boys. In a few parts of the world 5-alpha-reductase deficiency or defects of testosterone synthesis, or even rarer forms of intersex account for a significant portion of cases but these are rare in North America and Europe. Masculinizing surgery for completely virilized individuals with XX sex chromosomes and CAH is even rarer. An early procedure was performed by London surgeon Thomas Brand in 1779.

Orchiopexy for repair of undescended testes (cryptorchidism) is the second most common surgery performed on infant male genitalia (after circumcision). The surgeon moves one or both testes, with blood vessels, from an abdominal or inguinal position to the scrotum. If the inguinal canal is open it must be closed to prevent hernia. Potential surgical problems include blood vessels in the scrotum not being stretched or are separated and cannot be reconnected, leading to the death and atrophy of a testis.

Hypospadias repair may be a single-stage procedure if the hypospadias is of the first or second degree (urethral opening on glans or shaft respectively) and the penis is otherwise normal. Surgery for third-degree hypospadias (urethral opening on perineum or in urogenital opening) is more challenging, may be done in stages, and has a significant rate of complications and unsatisfactory outcomes. For severe hypospadias (3rd degree, on perineum) constructing a urethral tube the length of the phallus is not always successful, leaving an opening (a "fistula") proximal to the intended urethral opening. Sometimes a second operation is successful, but some boys and men have been left with chronic problems with fistulas, scarring and contractures that make urination or erections uncomfortable, and loss of sensation. It is increasingly recognized that long-term outcomes are poor.

Epispadias repair may involve comprehensive surgical repair of the genito-urinary area, usually during the first seven years of life, including reconstruction of the urethra, closure of the penile shaft and mobilisation of the corpora.

Urogenital closure is the closure of any midline opening at the base of the penis. In severe undervirilization, a boy may have a "pseudovaginal pouch," or a single urogenital opening in the midline of the perineum. Potential surgical problems: fistulas, scarring, and loss of sensation are the main risks. The most complicated aspect of closure involves moving the urethra to the phallus if it is not already there (i.e., repairing a perineal hypospadias).

Gonadectomy (also referred to as "orchiectomy") is the removal of the gonads. This is done in three circumstances. (1) If the gonads are dysgenetic testes or streak gonads and at least some of the boy's cells have a Y chromosome, the gonads or streaks must be removed because they are nonfunctional but have a relatively high risk of developing gonadoblastoma. (2) In rare instances when an XX child has completely virilizing congenital adrenal hyperplasia (Prader stage 5), the ovaries can be removed before puberty to stop breast development and/or menstruation. (3) Gonadectomy can be performed in the equally rare instance of a child with true hermaphroditism virilized enough to raise as male, in which ovaries or ovotestes can be removed. A lifetime of hormone replacement will be required, to avoid osteoporosis and enable sexual functioning.

Chordee release is the cutting of ventral penile skin and connective tissue to free and straighten the penis. A mild chordee, manifest as a well-formed penis "bent" downward by subcutaneous connective tissue, may be an isolated birth defect easily repaired by releasing some of the inelastic connective tissue on the ventral side of the shaft. In a complete chordee the phallus is "tethered" downward to the perineum by skin. A more severe chordee is often accompanied by a hypospadias and sometimes by severe undervirilization: a perineal "pseudovaginal pouch" and bifid ("split") scrotum with an undersized penis. This combination, referred to as pseudovaginal perineoscrotal hypospadias, is in the spectrum of ambiguous genitalia due to a number of conditions. Scarring and contracture are occasional complications, but most unsatisfactory outcomes occur when a severe hypospadias needs to be repaired as well. Long-term complications can include fistulas between colon or upper rectum and skin or other cavities, or between urethra and perineum as well as a loss of sensation.

Cloacal repair is among the most complex of the surgeries described here. Bladder exstrophy or more severe cloacal exstrophy is a major birth defect involving inadequate closure and incomplete midline fusion of multiple pelvic and perineal organs as well as the front of the pelvis and lower abdominal wall. The penis and scrotum are often widely bifid (the two embryonic parts unjoined). The penis often cannot be salvaged, although the testes can be retained. Repair may involve closure of the bladder, closure of the anterior abdominal wall, colostomy (temporary or permanent) with reconstruction of the rectum. If the halves of the phallus cannot be joined, they may be removed. The smallest defect in this spectrum is an epispadias. Surgical repair for this is primarily a phalloplasty. Surgery for the more severe degrees of cloacal exstrophy is extensive and usually multistage. A variety of potential problems and complications can occur, including need for long-term colostomy or vesicostomy. In many cases a functional penis cannot be created. Scarring is often extensive and the lower torso severely disfigured even with fairly good outcomes.

Phalloplasty is a general term for any reconstruction of the penis itself, especially for more unusual types of injuries, deformities, or birth defects. The principal difficulty is that erectile tissue is not easily constructed and this limits the surgeon's ability to make more than minor size changes. Construction of a narrow tube lined with mucosa (a urethra) is a similar challenge. Minor revisions of the skin are rarely followed by problems. More complicated reconstruction may result in scarring and contracture, which can distort the shape or curvature of the penis, or interfere with erections or make them painful.

Hysterectomy is removal of a uterus. It is rare that a uterus or Müllerian duct derivatives would need to be removed from a child being raised as a boy: see persistent Müllerian duct syndrome. The most common scenario is accidental discovery of persistent Müllerian derivatives or a small uterus during abdominal surgery of a normal boy for cryptorchidism, appendectomy, or bowel disease. Removal would not involve genital surgery. A rarer indication would be that of a completely virilized XX child with congenital adrenal hyperplasia (Prader stage 5) being raised as a male; ovaries and uterus must be removed to prevent breast development and menstruation by early adolescence. Risks are simply those of abdominal surgery.

Testicular prostheses are saline-filled plastic ovoids implanted in the scrotum. They have no function except to provide the appearance and feel of testes. Several sizes are available, but most are implanted in adolescence to avoid repeated procedures to implant larger sizes at puberty. Prostheses made of silastic are no longer available due to safety and perception-of-safety concerns. Potential surgical problems: foreign body reactions, rarely with infection or erosion of scrotal skin, are minimal but constitute the most significant complication.

Penile augmentation surgery is surgery intended to enlarge a small penis. Early attempts in the 1950s and 1960s involved constructing a tube of non-erectile flesh extending a small penis but the penis did not function. In recent years, a small number of urologists have been offering an augmentation procedure that involves moving outward some of the buried components of the corpora so that the penis protrudes more. The girth is augmented with transplantation of the patient's fat. This procedure is designed to preserve erectile and sexual function without surgically altering the urethra. This type of surgery is not performed on children and primarily produces a small increase in the size of a normal penis, but would be less likely to produce a major functional change in a severe micropenis. Potential surgical problems include reabsorption of the fat, scarring resulting in interference with erectile function, and issues with physical sensation.

Concealed penis where a normal penis is buried in suprapubic fat. In most cases, when the fat is depressed with the fingers, the penis is seen to be of normal size. This is common in overweight boys before the penile growth of puberty. Surgical techniques have been devised to improve it. The most common problems post-surgery are recurrence with continued weight gain and scarring.

=== Feminizing surgical procedures ===
In the last 50 years, the following procedures were most commonly performed to make the genitalia more typically female: virilization due to congenital adrenal hyperplasia; genital variations due, for example, to cloacal exstrophy; genital variations in infants with XY or mixed chromosomes to be raised as girls, such as gonadal dysgenesis, partial and complete androgen insensitivity syndrome, micropenis, cloacal and bladder exstrophy. In the 21st century, feminizing surgery to support reassignment of XY infants with non-ambiguous micropenis has been largely discontinued, and surgical reassignment of XY infants with exstrophy or other significant variations or injuries is diminishing. See history of intersex surgery.

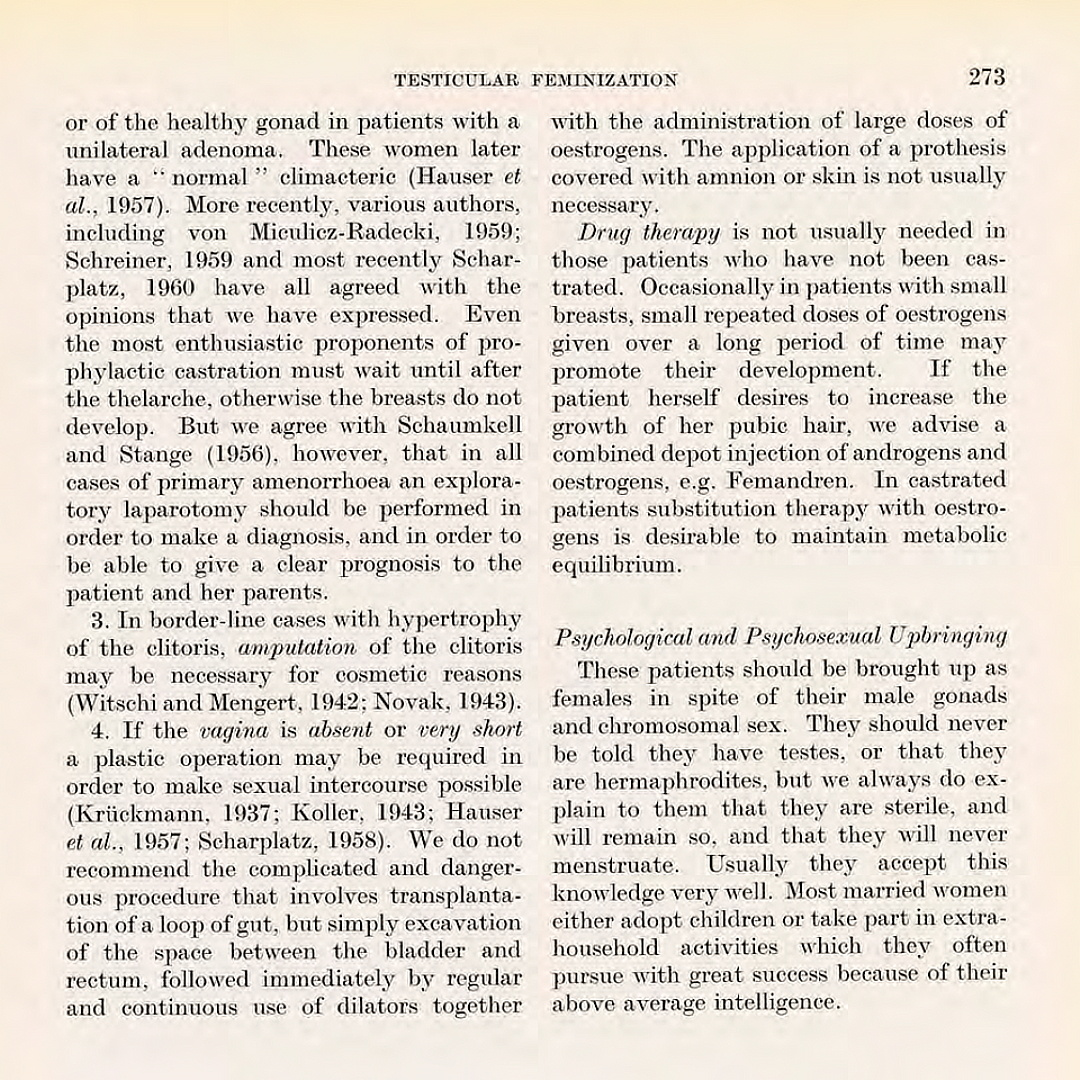
Licence to Lie and to Mutilate: "even the most enthusiastic proponents of prophylactic castration" - treatment of androgen insensitivity syndrome in 1963

Clitorectomy is the amputation or removal of most of the clitoris, including glans, erectile tissue, and nerves. This procedure was the most common clitoral surgery performed prior to 1970, but was largely abandoned by 1980 because it usually resulted in loss of clitoral sensation. The primary effect of this surgery is a drastic reduction in ability to experience orgasm. The appearance may differ from the expected surgical result. Regrowth of unwanted erectile tissue has sometimes presented problems.

Clitoroplasty, like phalloplasty, is a term that encompasses any surgical reconstruction of the clitoris, such as removal of the corpora. Clitoral recession and reduction can both be referred to as clitoroplasty. Major complications can include scarring, contractures, loss of sensation, loss of capacity for orgasm, and unsatisfactory appearance.

Clitoral recession involves the repositioning of the erectile body and glans of the clitoris farther back under the symphysis pubis and/or skin of the preputium and mons. This was commonly done from the 1970s through the 1980s to reduce protrusion without sacrificing sensation. Outcomes were often unsatisfactory, and it fell into disfavor in the last 15 years. Potential surgical problems: discomfort and pain post-procedure have been reported by some patients, including pain during erections. Adults who had a clitoral recession in early childhood often report reduced capacity for enjoyment of sexual intercourse, though similar women who had not had surgery also report a high rate of sexual dysfunction.

Clitoral reduction was developed in the 1980s to reduce size without reducing function. Lateral wedges of the erectile tissue of the clitoris are removed to reduce the size and protrusion. The neurovascular tissue is carefully spared to preserve function and sensation. Nerve stimulation and sensory responses are now often performed during the surgery to confirm function of the sensory nerves. Clitoral reduction is rarely done except in combination with vaginoplasty when substantial virilization is present. The degree to which the goal of preserving sexual sensations is attained is a subject of controversy regarding the necessity of such treatments, and lack of firm evidence of good outcomes. The success of more contemporary approaches was challenged by Thomas in 2004: "confidence in the superiority of modern surgery is almost certainly misplaced as the crucial components of current clitoral reduction surgery are not fundamentally different from those used in specialist centres 20 years ago".

Vaginoplasty, the construction or reconstruction of a vagina, can be fairly simple or quite complex, depending on the initial anatomy. If a normal internal uterus, cervix and upper vagina (the Müllerian derivatives) exist, and the outer virilization is modest, surgery involves separating the fused labia and widening the vaginal introitus. With greater degrees of virilization, the major challenge of the procedure is to provide a passage connecting the outer vaginal opening to the cervix which will stay wide enough to allow coitus. XY girls or women with partial androgen insensitivity syndrome will have a blind vaginal pouch of varying degrees of depth. Sometimes this can be dilated to a usable depth. Sometimes surgery is performed to deepen it.

Construction of a new vagina, known as neovagina, is considered a complex procedure that may carry a higher risk of complications. The most common instance of this is when a child will be assigned and raised as a female despite complete virilization, as with Prader 5 CAH, or (in the past) when a genetic male infant with a severely defective penis was reassigned as a female. One method is to use a segment of colon, which provides a lubricated mucosal surface as a substitute for the vaginal mucosa. Another is to line the new vagina with a skin graft. Stenosis (narrowing) of the constructed vagina is the most common long-term complication and the chief reason that a revision may be required when a girl is older. When a neovagina is made from a segment of bowel, it tends to leak mucus; when made with a skin graft, lubrication is necessary. Less common complications include fistulas, uncomfortable scarring, and problems with urinary continence.

Gonadectomy is removal of the gonads. If the gonads are dysgenetic testes or streak gonads and at least some of the cells have a Y chromosome, the gonads or streaks must be removed because they are nonfunctional but have a relatively high risk of developing gonadoblastoma. If the gonads are relatively "normal" testes, but the child is to be assigned and raised as female, (e.g., for intersex conditions with severe undervirilization, or major malformations involving an absent or unsalvageable penis) they must be removed before puberty to prevent virilization from rising testosterone.

Testes in androgen insensitivity are a special case: if there is any degree of responsiveness to testosterone, they should be removed before puberty. On the other hand, if androgen insensitivity is complete, the testes may be left to produce estradiol (via testosterone) to induce breast development, but there is a slowly increasing risk of cancer in adult life. Streak gonads without a Y chromosome cell line need not be removed but will not function. Finally, the gonads in true hermaphroditism must be directly examined; atypical gonads with Y line or potential testicular function should be removed but in rare instances a surgeon may try to preserve the ovarian part of an ovotestis. A lifetime of hormone replacement will be required in order to avoid osteoporosis and enable sexual functioning.

Cloacal exstrophy and bladder exstrophy repair is needed regardless of the sex of assignment or rearing. Simple bladder exstrophy in a genetic female does not usually involve the vagina. Cloacal exstrophy in a genetic female usually requires major surgical reconstruction of the entire perineum, including bladder, clitoris, symphysis pubis, and both the vaginal introitus and urethra. However, the uterus and ovaries are normally formed. Severe bladder exstrophy or cloacal exstrophy in genetic males often renders the phallus widely split, small, and unsalvageable. The scrotum is also widely split, though testes themselves are usually normal. From the 1960s until the 1990s, many of these infants were assigned and raised as females, with fashioning of a vagina and gonadectomy as part of the perineal reconstruction.

Surgery for the more severe degrees of cloacal exstrophy is extensive and usually multistage. A variety of potential problems and complications can occur, including need for long-term colostomy or vesicostomy. Creating a functional urethra is difficult and poor healing, with scarring, stricture, or fistula can require a vesicostomy to prevent urinary incontinence. Construction of a functional internal and external anal sphincter can be equally difficult when this has been disrupted as well. Functional problems can warrant a temporary or long-term colostomy. The added challenge for the most severely affected genetic females, and for genetic males who are being raised as females, is construction of a neovagina. Scarring and changes to the lower torso may happen even when the surgical outcome is considered successful. Finally, it has become apparent that some XY males (without intersex conditions) who are reassigned and raised as females have not developed a female gender identity and have sought reassignment back to male.

=== Hormone treatment ===
Hormone therapy can be broadly categorized by administering Testosterone or Estrogen. Some intersex conditions, including congenital adrenal hyperplasia, will need to be treated with hormone therapy due to a lack of or excessive amount of specific hormones. Some intersex people who have undergone certain surgeries, such as a gonadectomy, will require hormone therapy.. Possible side-effects of hormone therapy include blood clots, stroke, weight gain, and high blood pressure.

=== Genetic Selection and Terminations ===
The ethics of preimplantation genetic diagnosis to select against intersex traits was the subject of 11 papers in the October 2013 issue of the American Journal of Bioethics. There is widespread evidence of pregnancy terminations arising from prenatal testing, as well prenatal hormone treatment to prevent intersex traits.

There is widespread evidence of prenatal testing and hormone treatment to prevent intersex traits. In 1990, a paper by Heino Meyer-Bahlburg titled Will Prenatal Hormone Treatment Prevent Homosexuality? was published in the Journal of Child and Adolescent Psychopharmacology. It examined the use of "prenatal hormone screening or treatment for the prevention of homosexuality" using research conducted on fetuses with congenital adrenal hyperplasia (CAH). Dreger, Feder, and Tamar-Mattis describe how later research constructs "low interest in babies and men – and even interest in what they consider to be men's occupations and games – as "abnormal", and potentially preventable with prenatal dex [amethasone]".

In April 2014, Organisation Intersex International Australia made a submission on genetic selection via preimplantation genetic diagnosis to the National Health and Medical Research Council recommending that deselection of embryos and fetuses on grounds of intersex status should not be permitted. It quoted research by Professors Morgan Holmes, Jeff Nisker, associate professor Georgiann Davis, and by Jason Behrmann and Vardit Ravitsky. It quotes research showing pregnancy termination rates of up to 88% in 47,XXY even while the World Health Organization describes the trait as "compatible with normal life expectancy", and "often undiagnosed". Behrmann and Ravitsky find social concepts of sex, gender and sexual orientation to be "intertwined on many levels. Parental choice against intersex may thus conceal biases against same-sex attractedness and gender nonconformity."

== Outcomes and evidence ==
Specialists at the Intersex Clinic at University College London began to publish evidence in 2001 that indicated the harm that can arise as a result of inappropriate interventions, and advised minimising the use of childhood surgical procedures.

A 2004 paper by Heino Meyer-Bahlburg and others examined outcomes from early surgeries in individuals with XY variations, at one patient centre. The study has been used to support claims that "the majority of women... have clearly favored genital surgery at an earlier age" but the study was criticized by Baratz and Feder in a 2015 paper for neglecting to inform respondents that:

(1) not having surgery at all might be an option; (2) they might have had lower rates of reoperation for stenosis if surgery were performed later, or (3) that significant technical improvements that were expected to improve outcomes had occurred in the 13 or 14 years between when they underwent early childhood surgery and when it might have been deferred until after puberty.

=== Chicago Consensus Statement ===
In 2006, an invited group of clinicians met in Chicago and reviewed clinical evidence and protocols, and adopted a new term for intersex conditions: Disorders of sex development (DSD) in the journal article Consensus Statement on Intersex Disorders and their Management. The new term refers to "congenital conditions in which development of chromosomal, gonadal, or anatomical sex is atypical." The term has been controversial and not widely adopted outside clinical settings: the World Health Organization and many medical journals still refer to intersex traits or conditions. Academics like Georgiann Davis and Morgan Holmes, and clinical psychologists like Tiger Devore argue that the term DSD was designed to "reinstitutionalise" medical authority over intersex bodies. On surgical rationales and outcomes, the article stated that:

It is generally felt that surgery that is carried out for cosmetic reasons in the first year of life relieves parental distress and improves attachment between the child and the parents. The systematic evidence for this belief is lacking. ... information across a range of assessments is insufficient ... outcomes from clitoroplasty identify problems related to decreased sexual sensitivity, loss of clitoral tissue, and cosmetic issues ... Feminising as opposed to masculinising genitoplasty requires less surgery to achieve an acceptable outcome and results in fewer urological difficulties... Long term data on sexual function and quality of life among those assigned female as well as male show great variability. There are no controlled clinical trials of the efficacy of early (less than 12 months of age) versus late surgery (in adolescence and adulthood), or of the efficacy of different techniques"

=== Changing practices ===
Data presented in recent years suggests that little has changed in practice. Creighton and others in the UK have found that there have been few audits of the implementation of the 2006 statement, clitoral surgeries on under-14s have increased since 2006, and "recent publications in the medical literature tend to focus on surgical techniques with no reports on patient experiences".

In 2013, the Australian parliamentary became the first to investigate medical procedures and interventions performed on intersex individuals without their consent. The inquiry questions whether or not these interventions were done ethically and with the patient's approval and awareness. However, even though the Australian parliament became the first to perform these inquiries on the rights of intersex individuals, they have not been implemented. Non-voluntary or forced genital-normalizing surgeries are still performed with approval from the Family Court of Australia. Although Australia has legal inclusion policies that recognize binary and intersex bodies, the continuation of nonconsensual medical interventions and treatments suggests that practices have not changed much.

=== Patient outcomes ===
A 2014 civil society submission to the World Health Organization cited data from a large German Netzwerk DSD/Intersexualität study:

In a study in Lübeck conducted between 2005 and 2007 ... 81% of 439 individuals had been subjected to surgeries due to their intersex diagnoses. Almost 50% of participants reported psychological problems. Two thirds of the adult participants drew a connection between sexual problems and their history of surgical treatment. Participating children reported significant disturbances, especially within family life and physical well-being – these are areas that the medical and surgical treatment was supposed to stabilize.

A 2016 Australian study of persons born with atypical sex characteristics found that "strong evidence suggesting a pattern of institutionalised shaming and coercive treatment of people". Large majorities of respondents opposed standard clinical protocols.

The DSM-5 included a change from using gender identity disorder to gender dysphoria. This revised code now specifically includes intersex people who do not identify with their sex assigned at birth and experience clinically significant distress or impairment, using the language of disorders of sex development. This move was criticized by intersex advocacy groups in Australia and New Zealand.

When intersex individuals undergo non-consensual surgery at birth, it may be associated with long-term emotional distress and feelings of gender dysphoria. This is because "gender-normalizing" surgery is non-accepting towards intersex individual by forcing them to conform to a binary. There are changing practices surrounding intersex surgery of infants with more hospitals or medical professionals discouraging intersex surgery when the child cannot make the decision themselves. However, there have not been any federal or local policies in the United States surrounding non-consensual intersex surgery on infants or children.

=== 2016 Global DSD Update ===
A 2016 follow-up to the 2006 Consensus Statement, termed a Global Disorders of Sex Development Update stated,

There is still no consensual attitude regarding indications, timing, procedure and evaluation of outcome of DSD surgery. The levels of evidence of responses given by the experts are low (B and C), while most are supported by team expertise... Timing, choice of the individual and irreversibility of surgical procedures are sources of concerns. There is no evidence regarding the effect of surgically treated or non-treated DSDs during childhood for the individual, the parents, society or the risk of stigmatization... Physicians working with these families should be aware that the trend in recent years has been for legal and human rights bodies to increasingly emphasize preserving patient autonomy.

A 2016 paper on "Surgery in disorders of sex development (DSD) with a gender issue" repeated many of the same claims, but without reference to human rights norms. A commentary to that article by Alice Dreger and Ellen Feder criticized that omission, stating that issues have barely changed in two decades, with "lack of novel developments", while "lack of evidence appears not to have had much impact on physicians' confidence in a standard of care that has remained largely unchanged." Another 2016 commentary stated that the purpose of the 2006 Consensus Statement was to validate existing practices, "The authoritativeness and "consensus" in the Chicago statement lies not in comprehensive clinician input or meaningful community input, but in its utility to justify any and all forms of clinical intervention."

== Controversies and unsettled questions ==
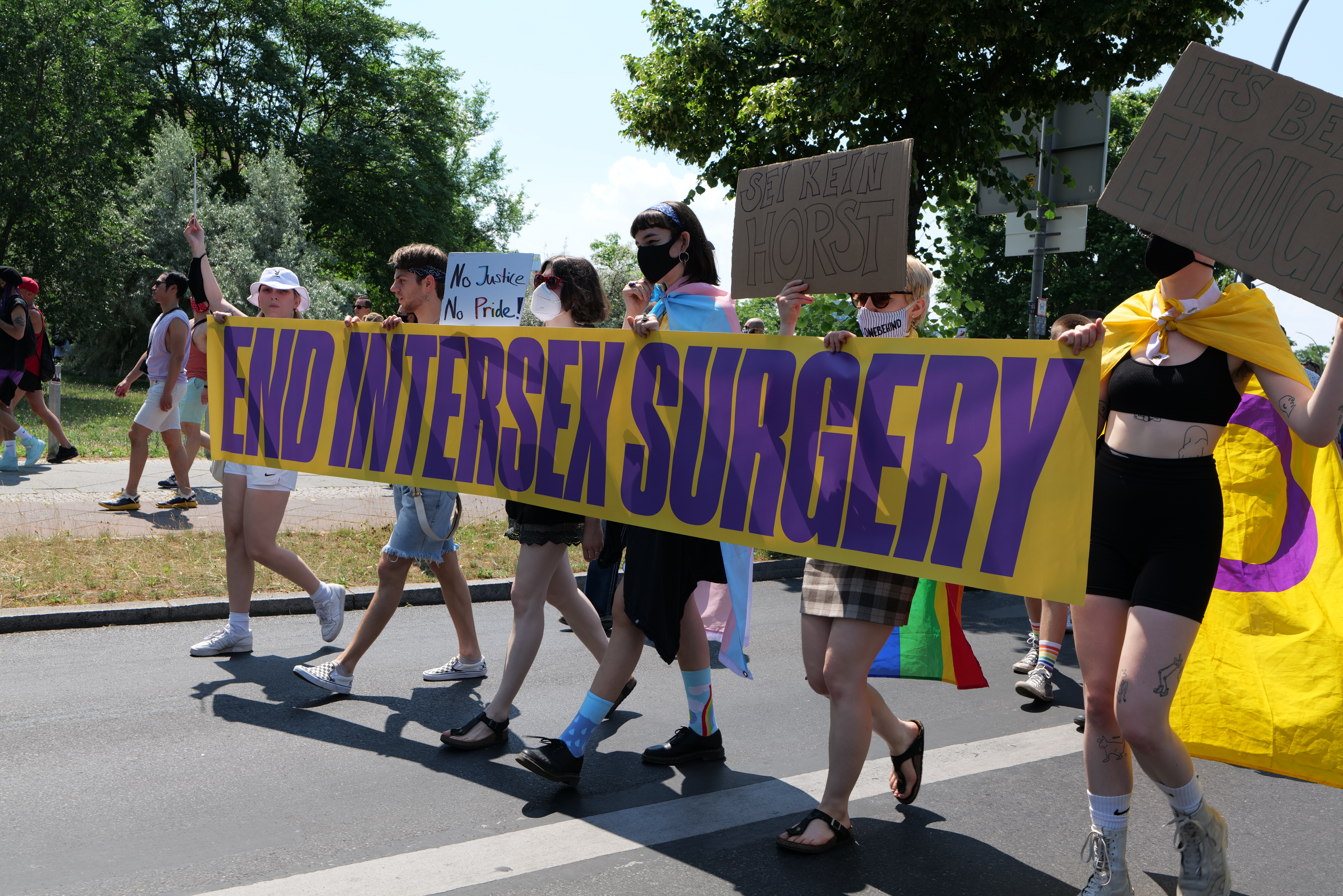
Intersex banner reading "End Intersex Surgery," Berlin Pride 27 June 2020

Management practices for intersex conditions have evolved over the last 60 years. In recent decades surgical practices have become the subject of public and professional controversy, and evidence remains lacking.

A 2024 systematic review found that ""Sex-normalising" interventions are conducted based largely on rationales that were not adequately supported by evidence, a desire from parents and surgeons to match genital cosmesis typically ascribed to male and female bodies, and a parental desire for intervention conduct." Most studies only reported on cosmetic outcomes as viewed by parents or doctors.

=== Comparing early against late surgeries ===
Argued or putative advantages of infant surgery:

- Tissue is more elastic and heals better according to many surgeons.
  Intersex Infant Surgery Laws by Country Map, 2024
- Genital surgery performed before the age of memory is less emotionally traumatic.
- Surgery in infancy avoids asking adolescent to make a decision that is stressful and difficult even for adults.
- Assuming infant surgery is successful, there is no barrier to engaging in normal sexual activities, and less distortion of psychosexual identity.

Argued or putative advantages of surgery in adolescence or later:

- If outcome is less than satisfactory, early surgery leaves a person wondering if they would have been better off without it.
- Any surgery not absolutely necessary for physical health should be postponed until the person is old enough to give informed consent.
- Genital surgery should be handled differently than other birth defect surgery; this is a type of surgery that parents should not be empowered to make decisions about because they will be under social pressure to make "bad" decisions.
- By mid-adolescence or later, persons may decide that their atypical genitalia do not need to be changed.
- Infant vaginoplasties should not be done because most people who have had them performed report some degree of difficulty with sexual function; even though we have no evidence that adult sexual function will be better if surgery is deferred, the outcomes could not be worse than they currently are after infant surgery.

Others argue that the key questions are not ones of early or late surgery, but questions of consent and autonomy.

=== Parental consent ===
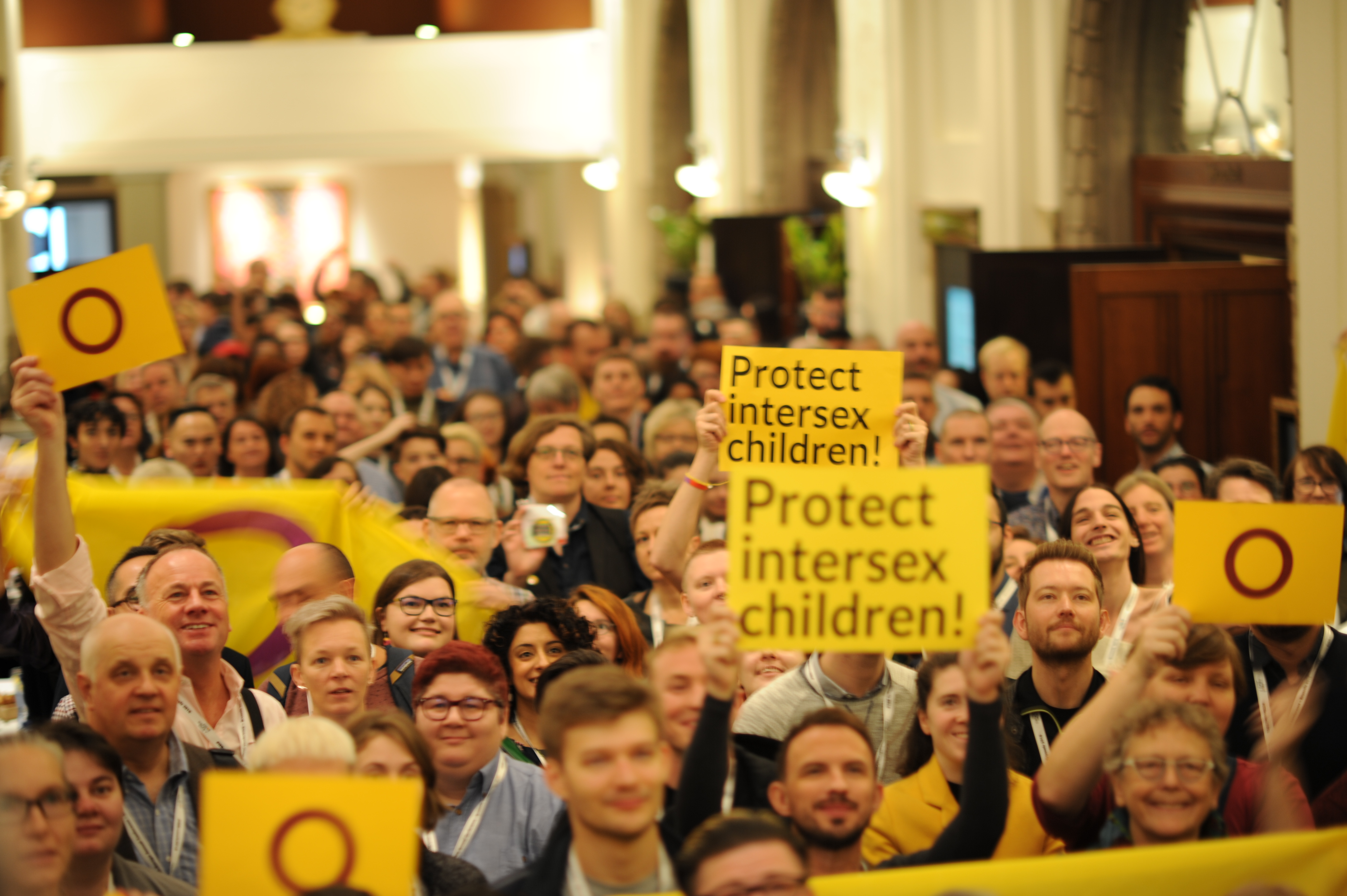
ILGA conference 2018, group photo to mark Intersex Awareness Day

Parents are frequently considered able to consent to feminizing or masculinizing interventions on their child, and this may be considered standard for the treatment of physical disorders. However, this is contested, particularly where interventions seek to address psychosocial concerns. A BMJ editorial in 2015 stated that parents are unduly influenced by medicalized information, may not realize that they are consenting to experimental treatments, and regret may be high. Research has suggested that parents are willing to consent to appearance-altering surgeries even at the cost of later adult sexual sensation. Child rights expert Kirsten Sandberg states that parents have no right to consent to such treatments.

=== Secrecy and information provision ===
Additionally, parents are not often consulted on the decision-making process when choosing the sex of the child, and they may be advised to conceal information from their child. The Intersex Society of North America stated that "For decades, medical approaches to intersex patients focused on concealment-centered treatment, one that features downplaying intersex as much as possible, even to the point of lying to patients about their conditions."

=== Sensation and sexual function ===
Reports published in the early 1990s state that 20–50% of surgical cases result in a loss of sexual sensation.

A 2007 paper by Yang, Felsen and Poppas provided what the authors believe is the first study of clitoral sensitivity after clitoris reduction surgery, but the research was itself the subject of ethical debate. Postoperative patients aged older than five years were "considered candidates" for clitoral sensitivity testing, and 10 of 51 patients were tested, with 9 undergoing extended vibratory sensory testing. The initial tests were performed on the inner thigh, labia majora, labia minora, vaginal introitus and clitoris, with a "cotton tip applicator" and extended tests with a biothesiometer, a medical device used to measure sensitivity thresholds. Values were recorded. The authors note that there are no control data "for assessment of the viability and function of the clitoris in unaffected women." The ethics of these tests have been criticized by bioethicists, and subsequently defended by the Office for Human Research Protections.

Loss of sexual function and sensation remains a concern in a submission by the Australasian Paediatric Endocrine Group to the Australian Senate in 2013. Clinical decision-making has prioritized perceived advantages from infant clitoral reduction surgery over the potential disadvantages of reduced or distorted sexual sensation. Human rights institutions stress the informed consent of the individual concerned.

=== Decision-making on cancer and other physical risks ===
In the cases where nonfunctional testes are present, or with partial androgen insensitivity syndrome, there is a risk that these develop cancer. They are removed by orchiectomy or monitored carefully. In a major Parliamentary report in Australia, published in October 2013, the Senate Community Affairs References committee was "disturbed" by the possible implications of current practices in the treatment of cancer risk. The committee stated: "clinical intervention pathways stated to be based on probabilities of cancer risk may be encapsulating treatment decisions based on other factors, such as the desire to conduct normalising surgery… Treating cancer may be regarded as unambiguously therapeutic treatment, while normalising surgery may not. Thus basing a decision on cancer risk might avoid the need for court oversight in a way that a decision based on other factors might not. The committee is disturbed by the possible implications of this..."

=== Gender identity issues ===
Gender identity and sexuality in intersex children have been problematized, and subjective judgements are made about the acceptability of risk of future gender dysphoria. Medical professionals have traditionally considered the worst outcomes after genital reconstruction in infancy to occur when the person develops a gender identity discordant with the sex assigned as an infant. Most of the cases in which a child or adult has voluntarily changed sex and rejected sex of assignment and rearing have occurred in partially or completely virilized genetic males who were reassigned and raised as females. This is the management practice that has been most thoroughly undermined in recent decades, as a result of a small number of spontaneous self-reassignments to male. Reducing the likelihood of a gender "mismatch" is also a claimed advantage of deferring reconstructive surgery until the patient is old enough to assess gender identity with confidence.

Human rights institutions question such approaches as being "informed by redundant social constructs around gender and biology".

=== Stigma and normality ===
Parents may be advised that without surgery, their child will be stigmatized, but they may make different choices with non-medicalized information. However, there is no evidence that surgeries help children grow up psychologically healthy.

Unlike other aesthetic surgical procedures performed on infants, such as corrective surgery for a cleft lip (as opposed to a cleft palate), genital surgery may lead to negative consequences for sexual functioning in later life (such as loss of sensation in the genitals, for example, when a clitoris deemed too large or penis is reduced/removed), or feelings of freakishness and unacceptability, which may have been avoided without the surgery. Studies have revealed how surgical intervention has had psychological effects, affecting well-being and quality of life. Genital surgeries do not ensure a successful psychological outcome for the patient and might require psychological support when the patient is trying to distinguish a gender identity. The Swiss National Advisory Commission on Biomedical Ethics states that, where "interventions are performed solely with a view to integration of the child into a family and social environment, then they run counter to the child's welfare. In addition, there is no guarantee that the intended purpose (integration) will be achieved."

Opponents of all "corrective surgery" on atypical sex characteristics suggest to change social opinion regarding the desirability of having genitalia that look more average, rather than perform surgery to try to make them more like those of other people.

=== Mental health risks and well-being of intersex individuals ===
Intersex individuals often do not receive support from their parents or family members. They may experience harm through their families, such as being forced to conform to gender expectations, be pressured or forced to take treatments or get medical interventions, or be completely shut-off from their family if they do not conform to what is expected. When examining suicide within the LGBTI community, it was found that there was limited studies conducted for the intersex community on reasons for committing suicide because researchers studied LGB communities far more frequently. Findings suggest that intersex individuals have higher rates of suicide or suicide related risk compared to the general population. In a national study conducted in the United States, it was found that "43% of [intersex adults] rated their physical health as fair or poor in comparison to 17.7% of the general U.S population."

=== Medical photography and display ===
Photographs of intersex children's genitalia are circulated in medical communities for documentary purposes, and individuals with intersex traits may be subjected to repeated genital examinations and display to medical teams. Problems associated with experiences of medical photography of intersex children have been discussed along with their ethics, control and usage. "The experience of being photographed has exemplified for many people with intersex conditions the powerlessness and humiliation felt during medical investigations and interventions".

=== Alternative pathways ===
In 2015, an editorial in the BMJ described current surgical interventions as experimental, stating that clinical confidence in constructing "normal" genital anatomies has not been borne out, and that medically credible pathways other than surgery do not yet exist.

== Human rights issues ==
The Council of Europe highlights several areas of concern in relation to intersex surgeries and other medical treatment:

- unnecessary "normalising" treatment of intersex persons, and unnecessary pathologisation of variations in sex characteristics.
- access to justice and reparation for unnecessary medical treatment, as well as inclusion in equal treatment and hate crime law.
- access to information, medical records, peer and other counselling and support.
- respecting self-determination in gender recognition, through expeditious access to official documents.

The Council of Europe argues that secrecy and shame have contributed to human rights concerns and reduced public understanding of the reality of intersex people. It calls for respect for "intersex persons' right not to undergo sex assignment treatment".

Alice Dreger, a US professor of Clinical Medical Humanities and Bioethics, argues that little has changed in actual clinical practice in recent years. Creighton and others in the UK have found that there have been few audits of the implementation of the 2006 statement, clitoral surgeries on under-14s have increased since 2006, and "recent publications in the medical literature tend to focus on surgical techniques with no reports on patient experiences".

Australia is the first to hold a "parliamentary inquiry" on non-consensual medical or surgical procedures and has recognized a third gender identity. The third gender identity is represented by the letter "X" for individuals who do not identify as male or female. In 2003, Alex Macfarlane became the first individual to receive a passport marked "X" for sex assignment.

Institutions like the Swiss National Advisory Commission on Biomedical Ethics, the Australian Senate, the Council of Europe, World Health Organization, and UN Office of the High Commissioner for Human Rights and Special Rapporteur on Torture have all published reports calling for changes to clinical practice.

In 2011, Christiane Völling won the first successful case brought against a surgeon for non-consensual surgical intervention. The Regional Court of Cologne, Germany, awarded her €100,000.

In 2014, the United Nations Human Rights Council published the Report of the Special Rapporteur on Torture and Other Cruel, Inhuman or Degrading Treatment or Punishment which identified gender-assigning surgery on intersex minors as examples of torture. The Special Rapporteur "calls on states" to ban or outlaw non-consensual surgeries or treatments that are irreversible.

In 2015, the European Union Agency for Fundamental Human Rights identified genital-normalizing surgery on intersex minors as medically unnecessary.

In April 2015, Malta became the first country to recognize a right to bodily integrity and physical autonomy, and outlaw non-consensual modifications to sex characteristics. The Act was widely welcomed by civil society organizations.

In June 2017, Joycelyn Elders, David Satcher, and Richard Carmona, three former Surgeons General of the United States published a paper at the Palm Center, calling for a rethink of early genital surgeries on children with intersex traits. The statement reflected on the history of such interventions, their rationales and outcomes, stating:

When an individual is born with atypical genitalia that pose no physical risk, treatment should focus not on surgical intervention but on psychosocial and educational support for the family and child. Cosmetic genitoplasty should be deferred until children are old enough to voice their own view about whether to undergo the surgery. Those whose oath or conscience says "do no harm" should heed the simple fact that, to date, research does not support the practice of cosmetic infant genitoplasty.

== See also ==
- Intersex healthcare
- History of intersex surgery
- Intersex human rights
- Disorders of sex development
- Medical torture
- Conversion therapy
- Sex assignment
