= Intersex genetic diagnosis =

Intersex people are born with natural variations in physical and sex characteristics including those of the chromosomes, gonads, sex hormones, or genitals that, according to the UN Office of the High Commissioner for Human Rights, "do not fit the typical definitions for male or female bodies". Such variations may involve genital ambiguity, and combinations of chromosomal genotype and sexual phenotype other than XY-male and XX-female. Preimplantation genetic diagnosis allows the elimination of embryos and fetuses with intersex traits and thus has an impact on discrimination against intersex people.

== Preimplantation genetic diagnosis ==
Preimplantation genetic diagnosis (PGD or PIGD) refers to genetic evaluation of embryos and oocytes prior to implantation. When used to screen for a specific genetic condition, the method also makes it possible to select embryos with intersex conditions for termination. Some national authorities, such as the UK Human Fertilization and Embryology Authority, maintain lists of conditions for which PGD is permissible, including intersex conditions such as 5 alpha reductase deficiency, androgen insensitivity syndrome, congenital adrenal hyperplasia and others.

Surgical interventions on children with intersex conditions are contentious and may lead to selection for other traits like same sex attraction. Robert Sparrow states that intersex conditions are comparable to sexual orientation in that harms may be associated with a "hostile social environment". He concluded that the acceptability of elimination of intersex conditions has "uncomfortable" implications for "other nonpathological human variations" that do not affect physical health.

Organisation Intersex International Australia has quoted research showing pregnancy termination rates of up to 88% in 47,XXY even while the World Health Organization describes the trait as "compatible with normal life expectancy", and "often undiagnosed". In 2014, it called for the Australian National Health and Medical Research Council to prohibit such interventions, noting a "close entanglement of intersex status, gender identity and sexual orientation in social understandings of sex and gender norms, and in medical and medical sociology literature". In 2016, the organization wrote about the sponsorship of lesbian, gay, bisexual, transgender and intersex (LGBTI) events by IVF clinics in Australia, stating that, in addition to ethical issues raised by the elimination of intersex traits, "sponsorship of "LGBTI" events by such businesses raises more ethical issues still, including the nature of community and comprehension of issues relating to intersex bodily diversity".

In response to Sparrow, Georgiann Davis argues that such discrimination fails to recognize that many people with intersex traits led full and happy lives, and that the "intersex community is only "invisible" to those who choose to ignore it", while "the medical profession, not the intersex trait itself, is a major source of the social and psychological harm that perpetuates intersex stigmatization and the "hostile social environment" that individuals with intersex traits encounter". Jeff Nisker links the elimination of intersex conditions to their pathologization, describing how "[o]nce a difference becomes a medical disorder to which the medical profession is dedicating time and resources to prevent, procedures to this end become endowed with appropriateness".

Jason Behrmann and Vardit Ravitsky state: "Parental choice against intersex may ... conceal biases against same-sex attractedness and gender nonconformity." In 2014, Morgan Carpenter expressed concern about intersex variations appeared in a list by the Human Fertilisation and Embryology Authority of "serious" "genetic conditions" that may be de-selected in the United Kingdom. These include 5-alpha-reductase deficiency and androgen insensitivity syndrome, traits evident in elite Olympic-level women athletes and "the world's first openly intersex mayor".

In 2015, the Council of Europe published an Issue Paper on Human rights and intersex people, remarking on a right to life:

Intersex people's right to life can be violated in discriminatory "sex selection" and "preimplantation genetic diagnosis, other forms of testing, and selection for particular characteristics". Such de-selection or selective abortions are incompatible with ethics and human rights standards due to the discrimination perpetrated against intersex people on the basis of their sex characteristics.

== Prenatal hormone treatment ==
Currently, prenatal testing and hormone treatment to prevent the physical and behavioral expression of intersex traits is available. In 1990, a paper by Heino Meyer-Bahlburg titled Will Prenatal Hormone Treatment Prevent Homosexuality? was published in the Journal of Child and Adolescent Psychopharmacology. It examined the use of "prenatal hormone screening or treatment for the prevention of homosexuality" using research conducted on foetuses with congenital adrenal hyperplasia and other traits.

Alice Dreger, Ellen Feder, and Anne Tamar-Mattis describe how research published by Saroj Nimkarn and Maria New in 2010 constructs "low interest in babies and men – and even interest in what they consider to be men's occupations and games – as "abnormal", and potentially preventable with prenatal dexamethasone". The authors state that "weak and unsupported conclusions" of investigations into the attempted "prevention of benign behavioral sex variations" indicates gaps in the ethical management of clinical research.

In 2012, Hirvikoski and others described a lack of long-term follow-up studies of individuals exposed to prenatal treatment, and the results of a 10-year Swedish study of 43 mothers and children. The authors found evidence of unacceptable side-effects in their study, including neurological consequences. Treatment with dexamethasone was discontinued in Sweden.

== See also ==
- Intersex medical interventions
- Preimplantation genetic diagnosis
- Sex selection
- Vaginal anomalies

== Bibliography ==
- Behrmann, Jason; Ravitsky, Vardit (October 2013). "Queer Liberation, Not Elimination: Why Selecting Against Intersex is Not "Straight" Forward". The American Journal of Bioethics. 13 (10): 39–41. doi:10.1080/15265161.2013.828131. ISSN 1526-5161. PMID 24024805. S2CID 27065247.
- Council of Europe; Commissioner for Human Rights (April 2015), Human rights and intersex people, Issue Paper
- Davis, Georgiann (October 2013). "The Social Costs of Preempting Intersex Traits". The American Journal of Bioethics. 13 (10): 51–53. doi:10.1080/15265161.2013.828119. ISSN 1526-5161. PMID 24024811. S2CID 7331095.
- Nisker, Jeff (October 2013). "Informed Choice and PGD to Prevent "Intersex Conditions"". The American Journal of Bioethics. 13 (10): 47–49. doi:10.1080/15265161.2013.828125. ISSN 1526-5161. PMID 24024809. S2CID 6085229.
- Organisation Intersex International Australia; Carpenter, Morgan (April 2014). "Submission on the Review of Part B of the Ethical Guidelines for the Use of Assisted Reproductive Technology in Clinical Practice and Research, 2007". Sydney.
- Sparrow, Robert (October 2013). "Gender Eugenics? The Ethics of PGD for Intersex Conditions". The American Journal of Bioethics. 13 (10): 29–38. doi:10.1080/15265161.2013.828115. ISSN 1526-5161. PMID 24024804. S2CID 41857961.
