= Congenital adrenal hyperplasia due to 21-hydroxylase deficiency =

- Other names: 21-OH CAH
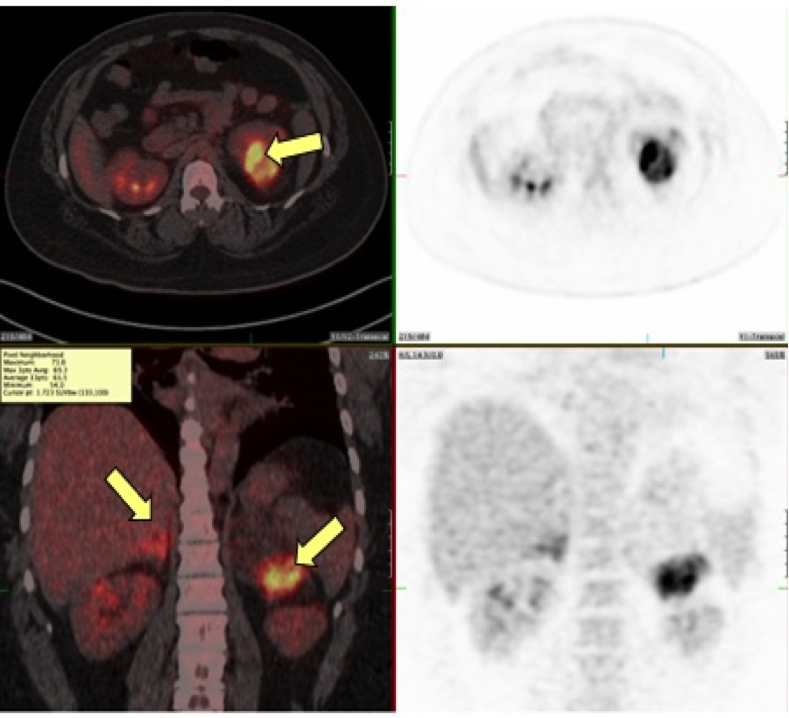
- CT scan shows enlarged adrenals with masses consistent with congenital adrenal hyperplasia due to 21-hydroxylase deficiency (image credit: NICHD/A. Mallappa, D. Merke)
- Specialty: Endocrinology
- Symptoms: Androgen excess and corticosteroid deficiencies
- Frequency: 1:18,000 to 1:14,000 (classical forms); 1:1000 to 1:50 (nonclassical forms)

Congenital adrenal hyperplasia due to 21-hydroxylase deficiency (CAH) is a genetic disorder characterized by impaired production of cortisol in the adrenal glands.

The condition is classified as an inherited metabolic disorder. CAH is an autosomal recessive condition since it results from inheriting two copies of the faulty CYP21A2 gene responsible for 21-hydroxylase enzyme deficiency. The most common forms of CAH are: classical form, usually diagnosed at birth, and nonclassical, late onset form, typically diagnosed during childhood or adolescence, although it can also be identified in adulthood when seeking medical help for fertility concerns or other related issues, such as PMOS or menstrual irregularities. Carriers for the alleles of the nonclassical forms may have no symptoms, such form of CAH is sometimes called cryptic form. Congenital adrenal hyperplasia due to 21-hydroxylase deficiency in all its forms accounts for over 95% of diagnosed cases of all types of congenital adrenal hyperplasia. Unless another specific enzyme is mentioned, CAH in most contexts refers to 21-hydroxylase deficiency. CAH is one of the most common autosomal recessive genetic diseases in humans.

Due to the loss of 21-hydroxylase function, patients are unable to efficiently synthesize cortisol. As a result, ACTH (adrenocorticotropic hormone) levels increase, leading to adrenocortical hyperplasia and overproduction of cortisol precursors, which are used in the synthesis of sex steroids, which can lead to signs of androgen excess, including ambiguous genitalia in newborn girls and rapid postnatal growth in both sexes. In severe cases of CAH in females, surgical reconstruction may be considered to create more female-appearing external genitalia. However, there is ongoing debate regarding the timing and necessity of surgery. The way CAH affects the organism is complicated, and not everyone who has it will show signs or have symptoms. Individuals with CAH may face challenges related to growth impairment during childhood and fertility issues during adulthood. Psychosocial aspects such as gender identity development and mental health should also be taken into consideration when managing individuals with CAH. Overall prognosis for individuals with appropriate medical care is good; however, lifelong management under specialized care is required to ensure optimal outcomes.

Treatment for CAH involves hormone replacement therapy to provide adequate levels of glucocorticoids and mineralocorticoids. Regular monitoring is necessary to optimize hormone balance and minimize potential complications associated with long-term glucocorticoid exposure.

== Presentation ==
CAH can occur in various forms. The clinical presentation of each form is different and depends to a large extent on the kind of the underlying 21-hydroxylase enzyme defect. Classical forms appear in infancy, and nonclassical forms appear in late childhood. The presentation in patients with classical CAH can be further subdivided into two forms: salt-wasting and simple-virilizing, depending on whether mineralocorticoid deficiency is present or absent, respectively. This subtyping is often not clinically meaningful, because all patients with classical form lose salt to some degree, and clinical presentations may overlap.

=== Severe, early onset 21-hydroxylase deficient CAH ===
The two most serious neonatal consequences of 21-hydroxylase deficiency are the following: life-threatening salt-wasting crises in the first month of life (for male and female infants alike) and severe virilization of female infants which can cause genital ambiguity. The subdivision of the early onset CAH into salt-wasting and simple-virilizing forms, which is based on the capacity of the adrenal to produce small amounts of aldosterone in the simple-virilizing form, is often not clinically meaningful, because clinical presentations overlap and all patients lose salt to some degree.

==== Salt-wasting crises in infancy ====
Excessive levels of androgens of adrenal origin have little effect on the genitals of male infants with classical CAH. If a male infant with CAH goes undetected during newborn screening, he will exhibit normal health and physical appearance upon examination, leading to his timely discharge from the hospital.

Aldosterone insufficiency in salt-wasting CAH results in a significant loss of sodium in the urine. Urinary sodium concentrations may exceed 50 mEq/L. Due to the loss of salt at that rate, the infant is unable to maintain proper blood volume and begins to suffer from dehydration due to hyponatremia by the end of the first week of life. Potassium and acid excretion are also impaired when mineralocorticoid activity is deficient, and hyperkalemia and metabolic acidosis gradually develop. When there's not enough cortisol in the body due to the classical CAH, it becomes harder to have proper blood circulation. Inadequate circulation can cause problems like spitting and difficulty gaining weight in babies. Furthermore, infants with salt-wasting CAH may experience even worse symptoms like vomiting, and extreme dehydration, and their circulation can suddenly fail (which is called circulatory shock) within two or three weeks after birth.

Upon admission to a medical facility, the infant between the ages of 1 and 3 weeks will exhibit signs of both underweight and dehydration. The blood pressure may be abnormally low. Basic laboratory analyses will indicate low levels of sodium (hyponatremia), typically falling between 105 and 125 mEq/L Na^{+} in serum samples. These infants may also experience severe hyperkalemia with potassium (K^{+}) levels exceeding 10 mEq/L, along with significant metabolic acidosis. Hypoglycemia (low blood sugar) might also be observed. This collection of manifestations is referred to as a "salt-wasting crisis" which poses an imminent risk of fatal consequences if left untreated.

Despite the severity of this condition, affected infants respond swiftly to treatment involving hydrocortisone administration along with intravenous infusion of saline solution and dextrose supplementation. Consequently, normal blood volume is promptly restored alongside stabilization of blood pressure and restoration of appropriate body sodium levels, leading to a reversal of hyperkalemia. With prompt and apt management measures in place, most infants are no longer at risk within a span of approximately 24 hours.

==== Virilization of female infants ====
The androgen backdoor pathway (red arrows) roundabout testosterone embedded within conventional androgen synthesis that lead to 5α-dihydrotestosterone through testosterone

CAH is a genetic disorder characterized by impaired production of cortisol in the adrenal glands.

Production of cortisol begins at week 8 of fetal life.

The 21-hydroxylase enzyme is essential in conversion of progesterone and 17OHP into 11-deoxycorticosterone and 11-deoxycortisol, respectively. This process is done through hydroxylation at C-21 position. Impaired steroid hydroxylation at the C-21 position in congenital adrenal hyperplasia, accompanied by excessive amounts of 17OHP that leads to virilism, was described as early as 1953.

In the insufficiency of 21-hydroxylase to participate in the biosynthesis of cortisol, the 21-hydroxylation in the zona fasciculata of the adrenal cortex is impaired, so 17OHP and progesterone will not be properly converted into 11-deoxycortisol and 11-deoxycorticosterone, respectively − the precursors for cortisol and aldosterone. As the plasma concentration of cortisol and aldosterone decreases, ACTH levels increase, leading to excessive production and accumulation of cortisol precursors (especially 17OHP), which are eventually transferred to androsterone that is a feedstock for other androgens. Other androgens may be additionally produced from 17OHP, due to its elevated levels, that leads, among other things, to its 5α-reduction. These additional androgens are produced via the so-called "backdoor pathway" (see red arrows on the diagram). For example, in this "backdoor" pathway, 5α-dihydrotestosterone is produced with roundabout of testosterone as an intermediate product. Some of the androgens produced by the backdoor pathway are those that cannot be converted to estrogens by aromatase, causing prenatal virilization, and making them the dominant androgens in classic 21-hydroxylase deficiency.

Virilization of genetically female (XX) infants usually produces obvious genital ambiguity. Inside the pelvis, the ovaries are normal and since they have not been exposed to testicular anti-Müllerian hormone (AMH), the uterus, fallopian tubes, upper vagina, and other Müllerian structures are normally formed as well. However, the high levels of testosterone in the blood can enlarge the phallus, partially or completely close the vaginal opening, enclose the urethral groove so that it opens at the base of the phallus, on the shaft or even at the tip like a boy. Testosterone can cause the labial skin to become as thin and rugate as a scrotum, but cannot produce palpable gonads (i.e., testes) in the folds.

Thus, depending on the severity of hyperandrogenism, a female infant can be mildly affected, visibly ambiguous, or so severely virilized as to appear to be a male. Andrea Prader devised the following Prader scale as a way of describing the degree of virilization.

- An infant at stage 1 has a mildly large clitoris and slightly reduced vaginal opening size. This degree may go unnoticed or may be simply assumed to be within normal variation.
- Stages 2 and 3 represent progressively more severe degrees of virilization. The genitalia are abnormal to the eye, with a phallus intermediate in size and a small vaginal opening.
- Stage 4 looks more male than female, with an empty scrotum and a phallus the size of a normal penis, but not quite free enough of the perineum to be pulled onto the abdomen toward the umbilicus (i.e., what is termed a chordee in a male). The single small urethral/vaginal opening at the base or on the shaft of the phallus would be considered a hypospadias in a male. X-rays taken after dye injection into this opening reveal the internal connection with the upper vagina and uterus. This common opening can predispose to urinary obstruction and infection.
- Stage 5 denotes complete male virilization, with a normally formed penis with the urethral opening at or near the tip. The scrotum is normally formed but empty. The internal pelvic organs include normal ovaries and uterus, and the vagina connects internally with the urethra as in Stage 4. These infants are not visibly ambiguous and are usually assumed to be ordinary boys with undescended testes. In most cases, the diagnosis of CAH is not suspected until signs of salt-wasting develop a week later.

When the genitalia are determined to be ambiguous at birth, CAH is one of the leading diagnostic possibilities. Evaluation reveals the presence of a uterus, extreme elevation of 17OHP, levels of testosterone approaching or exceeding the male range but low AMH levels. The karyotype is that of an ordinary female: 46, XX. With this information, the diagnosis of CAH is readily made and the female sex is confirmed.

Evaluation of ambiguous genitalia is described in detail elsewhere. In most cases, it is possible to confirm and assign female sex within 12–36 hours of birth. The exception is the rare, completely virilized genetic female (Prader stage 5), who presents the most challenging assignment and surgery dilemmas.

When the degree of ambiguity is obvious, corrective surgery is usually offered and performed, but reconstructive surgery on infant genitalia has controversies.

==== Reduced fertility ====
===== Testicular adrenal rest tumors =====
Infertility observed in adult males with classical CAH has been associated with testicular adrenal rest tumors (TART) that may originate during childhood. Delayed diagnosis of CAH was associated with a higher risk of developing TART, which may be attributable to poor disease control early in life, emphasizing the need of early detection and management of CAH, and, once CAH is detected, detection and management of TART. TART in prepubertal males with classical CAH could be found during childhood (20%). Martinez-Aguayo et al. reported differences in markers of gonadal function in a subgroup of patients, especially in those with inadequate control. Early glucocorticoid therapy may be beneficial to the reduction of TART. Early detection and management of TART in CAH patients is important for preserving testicular function and preventing long-term complications that may impact fertility. To avoid long-term complications in male patients with CAH, regular ultrasound examination of the scrotum is recommended, especially in patients presenting with the most profound phenotypes of CAH and suboptimal endocrine regulation of the condition. Subsequently, male subjects with nonclassic CAH rarely present with TARTs, and even though these tumors do not affect fertility and do not require regular ultrasound examination of the scrotum.

===== Female fertility =====
Women with classical CAH have statistically reduced fertility, especially those with the salt-losing form. Live birth rate is 33–50% in simple virilized form of CAH and 0–10% in most severe salt-wasting form. In the nonclassical form of CAH, the live birth is 63–90%, similar to the age-matched control groups.

==== Sex assignment ====
Classical CAH leads to female pseudohermaphroditism at birth, and is the most common cause of sex ambiguity, the second one is mixed gonadal dysgenesis. Most commonly, at birth, the phallus enlarges, so it is larger than a normal female but smaller than a normal male. Instead of separate urethral and vaginal openings, there is a urogenital sinus that is often covered by tissue resulting from the posterior fusion of the labioscrotal ridges. Therefore, different degrees of external genital abnormalities can be found, ranging from normal perineum to penile urethra.

There are no difficulties assigning appropriate sex for most infants with CAH. Genetic males have normal male genitalia and gonads and simply need hormone replacement. Most virilized females are assigned and raised as girls even if their genitalia are ambiguous or look more male than female. They have normal ovaries and uterus and potential fertility with hormone replacement and surgery. The complex issues encountered in appropriate sex assignment for severely virilized XX infants have informed the understanding of gender identity and sexual orientation, and the matter remains debated.

Until the 1950s, some virilized XX infants were assigned and raised as girls, and some as boys. Most developed gender identities are congruent with their sex of rearing. In a few cases of male rearing, a sex reassignment was attempted in mid-childhood when newly discovered karyotyping revealed "female" chromosomes. These reassignments were rarely successful, leading New Zealand American psychologist John Money and other influential psychologists and physicians to conclude that gender identity was (1) unrelated to chromosomes, (2) primarily a result of social learning, and (3) could not be easily changed after infancy.

By the 1960s, CAH was well understood, karyotyping was routine, and standard management was to assign and raise all children with CAH according to their gonads and karyotypes, no matter how virilized. Markedly virilized girls were usually referred to a pediatric surgeon, often a pediatric urologist for a reconstructive vaginoplasty and clitoral reduction or recession—surgery to create or enlarge a vaginal opening and reduce the size or protrusion of the clitoris. This approach was designed to preserve fertility for both sexes and remains the standard management, but two aspects of this management have been challenged: assignment of completely virilized genetic females and the value and age of corrective surgery.

The first questions about assignment were raised in the early 1980s when Money and others reported an unexpectedly high rate of failure to achieve expected adult sexual relationships (i.e., heterosexual orientation, marriage, and children) in grown women with CAH (though all had female gender identities). However, the sample was small, and results seemed interpretable in many ways: selection bias, early hormone effects on orientation, or sexual dysfunction created by residual body abnormalities or by the genital surgery itself. From a perspective two decades later, the report was one of the first pieces of evidence that the standard management approach was not always producing the hoped-for outcomes.

Despite these concerns, no significant opposition to standard management arose until the mid-1990s, when a confluence of evidence and opinion from several sources led to a re-examination of outcomes. Several intersex support and advocacy groups (e.g., the Intersex Society of North America) began to publicly criticize infant genital surgery based on unsatisfactory outcomes of some adults who had been operated on as infants. Their complaints were that they had a reduced ability to enjoy sexual relations or that they resented not having had the choice of gender assignment or surgical reconstruction left until they were old enough to participate.

In 1997, influential articles by Reiner, Diamond, and Sigmundson advocated consideration of (1) male sex assignment in the unambiguously male XX infants (most of whom are considered male until the CAH is recognized at 1–2 weeks of age), and (2) delaying reconstructive surgery until the patient is old enough to participate in the decision.

Although the standard management approach remains "standard", more time and consideration are being given in many cases to explaining alternatives to parents and a small number of XX children with unambiguously male external genitalia are again being raised as boys.

=== Late onset (nonclassical) CAH ===
In the milder, nonclassical form of CAH, the androgen excess is subtle enough that virilization is not apparent or goes unrecognized at birth and in early childhood. However, androgen levels are above normal and slowly rise during childhood, producing noticeable effects between 2 and 9 years of age.

The appearance of pubic hair in mid-childhood is the most common feature that leads to evaluation and diagnosis of the late onset (nonclassical) CAH. Other accompanying features are likely to be tall stature and accelerated bone age (often 3–5 years ahead). Often present are increased muscle mass, acne, and adult body odor. In boys, the penis will be enlarged. Mild clitoral enlargement may occur in girls, and sometimes a degree of prenatal virilization is recognized that may have gone unnoticed in infancy.

The principal goals of treatment of nonclassical CAH are to preserve as much growth as possible and to prevent central precocious puberty if it has not already been triggered. These goals are more difficult to achieve than in CAH detected in infancy because moderate levels of androgens will have had several years to advance bone maturation and to trigger central puberty before the disease is detected.

A diagnosis of nonclassical CAH is usually confirmed by discovering extreme elevations of 17OHP along with moderately high testosterone levels. A cosyntropin stimulation test may be needed in mild cases, but usually, the random levels of 17OHP are high enough to confirm the diagnosis.

Elevated 17OHP may activate the androgen "backdoor" pathway, that leads to an excess of 5α-dihydrotestosterone and other potent androgens.

The mainstay of treatment for symptoms of hyperandrogenism is suppression of androgens of adrenal origin by a glucocorticoid such as hydrocortisone. Mineralocorticoid is only added in cases where the plasma renin activity is high. Most patients that have the nonclassic form do not require any glucocorticoid replacement therapy, as cortisol synthesis impairment is mild but clinically silent. Patients usually have the same baseline but lower peak cortisol levels compared to healthy controls. The exact degree of cortisol synthesis impairment depends on the genotype.

An important aspect of managing nonclassic CAH is the suppression of central precocious puberty if it has begun. The usual clues to central puberty in boys are that the testes are pubertal in size, or that androgens of adrenal origin remain elevated even when the 17OHP has been reduced toward normal. In girls central puberty is less often a problem, but breast development would be the main clue. Central precocious puberty is suppressed when appropriate by leuprolide.

As outlined above, recent additions to treatment to preserve growth include aromatase inhibition to slow bone maturation by reducing the amount of testosterone converted to estradiol, and the use of blockers of estrogen for the same purpose.

Once adrenal suppression has been achieved, the patient needs stress steroid coverage as described above for significant illness or injury.

Many variants of the CYP21A2 gene result in various degrees of hyperandrogenism, some of which may be so mild that they may not even cause problems in males and may not be recognized until adolescence or later in females. Mild androgen effects in young women may include hirsutism, acne, or anovulation (which in turn can cause infertility). Testosterone levels in these women may be mildly elevated, or simply above average. Despite the prevailing notion that testosterone and 5α-dihydrotestosterone (DHT) are the primary human androgens, this notion only applies to healthy men. Although testosterone has been traditionally used as a biomarker of hyperandrogenism, it correlates poorly with clinical measurements of androgen excess. While testosterone levels can appear normal, ignoring the alternative androgen pathways may lead to diagnostic errors since hyperandrogenism may be caused by potent androgens such as DHT produced by a backdoor pathway and 11-oxygenated androgens. 11-ketotestosterone may be the main androgen in women, since it circulates at a similar level to testosterone and may or may not decline with age as testosterone does. While 11-ketodihydrotestosterone (11KDHT) is equipotent to DHT, circulating levels of 11KDHT are lower than DHT. Unlike testosterone and androstenedione, 11-oxygenated androgens are not known to be aromatized to estrogens in the human body.

These clinical features are those of polyendocrine metabolic ovarian syndrome (PMOS), and a small percentage of women with PMOS are found to have late-onset CAH when investigated. Late-onset CAH is often misdiagnosed as PMOS.

Late-onset CAH is often diagnosed in the context of infertility assessment in women. Diagnosis of late-onset CAH may be suspected from a high 17OHP level, but some cases are so mild that the elevation is only demonstrable after cosyntropin stimulation. Treatment may involve a combination of very low dose glucocorticoid to reduce adrenal androgen production and any of various agents to block the androgen effects and/or induce ovulation. During the follicular phase of the menstrual cycle, progesterone accumulates along with 17OHP which can thin the endometrium and change cervical mucus like the effect of progestogen contraceptives, interferes with the normal menstrual cycle, which can lead to oligomenorrhea or amenorrhea and impairs sperm penetration. Abnormal endometrial development leads to decreased uterine receptivity, which also contributes to infertility. Once attempting to conceive, most women with late-onset CAH will become pregnant within a year with or without treatment, but they have an increased risk of miscarriage.

Late onset CAH was originally characterized in 1957 by French biochemist Jacques Decourt, but the association with mild 21-hydroxylase deficiency called nonclassical 21-hydroxylase deficiency, which is characterized by diverse hyperandrogenic symptoms appearing postnatally in males and females, was first described in 1979 by Maria New. New since then have studied ways to reduce androgen excess and found out that treatment with dexamethasone 0.25 mg orally every evening reversed acne and irregular menstruation in 3 months, but hirsutism required up to 30 months. Dexamethasone has glucocorticoid activity, and potent ACTH-suppression properties within the hypothalamic–pituitary–adrenal axis. Lower ACTH leads to reduced production of all the steroids, including androgens. According to 2018 Clinical Practice Guideline, glucocorticoid treatment is not recommended in asymptomatic individuals, however, if the symptoms of androgen excess are sufficient, dexamethasone treatment may be prescribed. Another treatment option is oral contraceptive pills.

== Genetics ==
21-hydroxylase CAH is inherited in an autosomal recessive fashion.

The CYP21A2 gene for the P450c21 enzyme (also known as 21-hydroxylase) is at 6p21.3, amid genes HLA B and HLA DR coding for the major human histocompatibility loci (HLA). The protein-coding CYP21A2 gene may be accompanied by one or several copies of the nonfunctional pseudogene CYP21A1P. Scores of abnormal alleles of CYP21A2 have been documented, most arising from recombinations of homologous regions of CYP21A2 and CYP21A1P. The 21-hydroxylase deficiency may be caused by macrodeletions of about 30 Kb, which includes most of the 5′ region of the CYP21A2 gene as well as all of the C4B gene and 3′ regions of the CYP21A1P pseudogene. Duplications of CYP21A1P pseudogene and C4B gene are often associated with nonclassic 21-hydroxylase deficiency.

Due to the high degree of homology between the CYP21A2 gene and the CYP21A1P pseudogene, and the complexity of the locus, research on the molecular level is difficult.

Differences in residual enzyme activity of the various alleles account for the various degrees of severity of the disease. Inheritance of all forms of 21-hydroxylase CAH is autosomal recessive, except some mild disease-causing variants such as p.V281L that seem to exert dominant negative effects on enzymatic activity.

Persons affected by any form of the disease have two abnormal alleles, and both parents are usually heterozygotes (or carriers). When both parents carry an abnormal allele, each child has a 25% chance of having the disease, a 50% chance of being a carrier like the parents, and a 25% chance of having two normal genes.

Heterozygosity can be tested by measuring 17OHP elevation after ACTH stimulation.

More than 200 disease-causing variants within the CYP21A2 gene have been identified so far that lead to 21-hydroxylase deficiency. Most patients have at least two of these variants present as compound heterozygous.

There are some mild disease-causing variants that seem to exert dominant negative effects on enzymatic activity, even if present as single heterozygous. One example is a point mutation in exon 7 of CYP21A2, (p.V281L), which is commonly found in LOCAH-associated alleles. Carriers for this mutation retain 20–50% of 21-hydroxylase activity, but are at higher risk of symptoms of androgen excess than carriers of the severe mutations, and had higher adrenocorticotropic hormone (ACTH) stimulated 17OHP, suggesting that the mutant protein V281L enzyme co-expressed with the wild-type (healthy) enzyme resulted in an apparent dominant negative effect on the enzymatic activity.

There is a good correlation between the genotype and phenotype. As a result, the CYP21A2 genotyping has high diagnostic value. However, the genotyping of the CYP21A2 gene is prone to errors, especially due to the closely located and highly homologous pseudogene CYP21A1P and the complex duplications, deletions, and rearrangements within chromosome 6p21.3. For this reason, CYP21A2 genotyping, interpretation of the results, and adequate genetic counseling for patients and their families require a deep understanding of CYP21A2 genetics.

The CYP21A1P pseudogene retains 98% exonic sequence identity with the functional gene CYP21A2, and the high degree of sequence similarity between them indicates that these two genes are evolving in tandem through intergenic exchange of DNA. Both genes are located on chromosome 6, in the major histocompatibility complex III (MHC class III) close to the Complement component 4 genes C4A and C4B, the Tenascin X gene TNXB and WHR1. MHC class III is the most gene-dense region of the human genome, containing many genes that yet have unknown function or structure.

The CYP21A2 gene is located within the RCCX cluster (an abbreviation composed of the names of the genes RP (a former name for WHR1 Winged helix repair factor 1), C4, CYP21 and TNX), which is the most complex gene cluster in the human genome. The number of RCCX segments varies between one and four in a chromosome, with the prevalence of approximately 15% for monomodular, 75% for bimodular (STK19-C4A-CYP21A1P-TNXA-STK19B-C4B-CYP21A2-TNXB), and 10% for trimodular in Europeans. The quadrimodular structure of the RCCX unit is rare. In a monomodular structure, all of the genes are functional i.e. protein-coding, but if a module count is two or more, there is only one copy of each functional gene rest being non-coding pseudogenes except the C4 gene which always has active copies.

Due to the high degree of homology between the CYP21A2 gene and the CYP21P1 pseudogene and the complexity of the locus, it is difficult to study the CYP21A2 gene at the molecular level, giving sometimes inaccurate or inconclusive results. The targeted long-read sequencing method aims to improve the accuracy of the findings, however, the clinical use of this method is limited.

The cryptic form of (CAH) refers to a condition in which an individual is genetically determined to have the nonclassic variant of CAH but does not display any obvious symptoms. The term "cryptic" is used due to the lack of symptomatology in these individuals. Most males and some females with nonclassic CAH do not exhibit clinical signs or symptoms. However, the exact prevalence of asymptomatic individuals among those genetically identified with nonclassic CAH is currently unknown. Therefore, it is also uncertain what proportion of this population represents the cryptic form of CAH.

== Pathophysiology ==
Steroidogenesis: Deficiency in 21-hydroxylase (green vertical bar visible near the top center) leads to accumulation of progesterone and 17α-hydroxyprogesterone; excessive accumulation of these steroids leads to their conversion to androgens (lower left), whereas production of mineralcorticoids and glucocorticoids (top left), including cortisol, is reduced.

The enzyme P450c21, commonly referred to as 21-hydroxylase (21-OH), is embedded in the smooth endoplasmic reticulum of the cells of the adrenal cortex. It catalyzes hydroxylation of 17α-hydroxyprogesterone (17OHP) to 11-deoxycortisol in the glucocorticoid pathway, which starts from pregnenolone and finishes with cortisol. It also catalyzes hydroxylation of progesterone to 11-deoxycorticosterone (DOC) in the mineralocorticoid pathway on its way from pregnenolone to aldosterone.

Deficient activity of this enzyme reduces the efficiency of cortisol synthesis, with consequent hyperplasia of the adrenal cortex and elevation of ACTH levels. ACTH stimulates the uptake of cholesterol and the synthesis of pregnenolone. Steroid precursors up to and including progesterone, 17α-hydroxypregnenolone, and especially 17OHP accumulate in the adrenal cortex and circulating blood. Blood levels of 17OHP can reach 10-1000 times the normal concentration.

Since 21-hydroxylase activity is not involved in the synthesis of androgens, a substantial fraction of the large amounts of 17α-hydroxypregnenolone is diverted to the synthesis of DHEA, androstenedione, and other androgens of adrenal origin beginning in the third month of fetal life in both sexes.

Synthesis of aldosterone is also dependent on 21-hydroxylase activity. Although fetal production is impaired, it causes no prenatal effects, as the placental connection allows maternal blood to "dialyze" the fetus and maintain both electrolyte balance and blood volume.

== Diagnosis ==
Since CAH is an autosomal recessive disease, most children with CAH are born to parents unaware of the risk and with no family history. Each child born to two carrier parents will have a 25% chance of having the disease.

=== Classification ===
The condition can be classified into "salt-wasting", "simple virilizing", and "nonclassical" forms.

| Type | Sex steroid effects | Other effects |
|---|---|---|
| Severe 21-hydroxylase deficiency causes salt-wasting CAH | The most common cause of ambiguous genitalia due to prenatal virilization of genetically female (XX) infants. | Life-threatening vomiting and dehydration occurring within the first few weeks of life. Aldosterone and cortisol levels are both reduced. |
| Moderate 21-hydroxylase deficiency is referred to as simple virilizing CAH | Typically is recognized as causing virilization of prepubertal children. | Cortisol is reduced, but aldosterone is not. |
| Still milder forms of 21-hydroxylase deficiency are referred to as nonclassical CAH | Can cause androgen effects and infertility in adolescent and adult women. | Cortisol is mildly reduced depending on genotype, but aldosterone is not. |
| Patients who are genetically found to have nonclassical CAH but are asymptomatic | No symptoms of androgen excess, levels of androgens are within the normal range. | Neither aldosterone nor cortisol are reduced. |

The salt-wasting and simple virilizing types are sometimes grouped as "classical".

=== Newborn screening ===
Conditions justifying newborn screening for any disorder include (1) a simple test with an acceptable sensitivity and specificity, (2) a dire consequence if not diagnosed early, (3) an effective treatment if diagnosed, and (4) a frequency in the population high enough to justify the expense. In the last decade, more states and countries have adopted newborn screening for salt-wasting CAH due to 21-hydroxylase deficiency, which leads to death in the first month of life if not recognized.

The salt-wasting form of CAH has an incidence of 1 in 15,000 births and is potentially fatal within a month if untreated. Steroid replacement is a simple, effective treatment. However, the screening test itself is less than perfect, because of low specificity and high levels of false positives, meaning that the tests sometimes give incorrect results, saying the baby has CAH when they actually do not. These false positives can worry the family and lead to unnecessary spending on hospital visits and extra tests. For the newborn screening, levels of 17α-hydroxyprogesterone (17OHP) are typically measured against predetermined cutoff, which depends on the measurement method. While the 17OHP level is easy to measure and sensitive (rarely missing real cases), the test has a poorer specificity, giving high rates of false positives. Screening programs in the United States have reported that 99% of positive screens turn out to be false positives upon investigation of the infant. This false-positive rate is higher than that of the screening tests for many other congenital metabolic diseases.

Measurement 17OHP by LC-MS/MS reduces the false positive rate in newborn screening compared to measurement by immunoassays. 17OHP steroid precursors and their sulphated conjugates which are present in the first two days after birth in healthy infants and longer in pre-term neonates, cross-react in immunoassays with 17OHP, giving falsely high 17OHP levels.

When a positive result is detected, the infant must be referred to a pediatric endocrinologist to confirm or disprove the diagnosis. Since most infants with salt-wasting CAH become critically ill by 2 weeks of age, the evaluation must be done rapidly despite the high false positive rate.

Levels of 17OHP, androstenedione, and cortisol may play a role in screening.

=== Additional markers ===
While 17OHP with or without ACTH stimulation is the main marker for 21-hydroxylase deficiency, other markers have been proposed, with various degrees of acceptance:

- 21-Deoxycortisol is elevated in 21-hydroxylase deficiency. However, it is not elevated in preterm infants or in other forms of congenital adrenal hyperplasia. Unlike 17OHP, 21-deoxycortisol is not produced in the gonads and is uniquely adrenal-derived. Consequently, 21-deoxycortisol it is a more specific marker of the 21-hydroxylase deficiency than 17OHP. Even so, 21-deoxycortisol measurement has not been commonly performed by laboratories until 2019. Still, 21-deoxycortisol can be a key screening marker for 21-hydroxylase deficiency in newborn screening.
- 21-Deoxycorticosterone, also known as 11β-hydroxyprogesterone (11β-OHP), have been proposed as a marker in 1987. A study in 2017 has shown that in subjects with 21-hydroxylase deficiency, serum 11β-OHP concentrations range from 0.012 to 3.37 ng/mL, while in control group it was below detection limit of 0.012 ng/mL. This marker did not gain acceptance due to the fact that the test for the levels of this steroid is not routinely offered by diagnostic laboratories.
- Progesterone levels are higher in CAH subjects. A study has revealed that serum progesterone concentrations in boys (10 days to 18 years old) with 21-hydroxylase deficiency reached levels up to 10.14 ng/mL, i.e. similar to female luteal values, while in the control group of boys, average level was 0.07 ng/mL (0.22 nmol/L), with values ranging from 0.05 to 0.40 ng/mL. The authors of the study propose to use progesterone as an additional marker for 21-hydroxylase deficiency. The study shows that the progesterone levels in CAH and non-CAH females are the same as in CAH and non-CAH males respectively – it is the condition that affects progesterone levels, not the sex, but for women between menarche and menopause, progesterone should be measured in days 3–5 of the cycle to have diagnostic value – the same condition also applies for 17OHP. The specificity of progesterone as a marker of 21-hydroxylase deficiency, as opposed to deficiency of other enzymes involved in steroid pathways, is still not well studied.
- Cortisol is one of the two main final products of 21-hydroxylase, and the deficiency of this enzyme may lead to a certain degree of cortisol deficiency. Cortisol levels are lower in CAH subjects, on average, however, in milder cases cortisol levels can be normal, but, this has not been yet well studied. Cortisol measurement using immunoassays is prone to cross-reactivity with various substances including 21-deoxycortisol that raises due to 21-hydroxylase deficiency, leading to falsely high cortisol levels when the true cortisol is actually low. The selectivity offered by liquid chromatography-tandem mass spectrometry (LC-MS/MS) has largely overcome these limitations. As a result, the use of LC-MS/MS instead of immunoassays in cortisol measurement aims to provide greater specificity.
- 11-Deoxycortisol is a direct product of 17α-hydroxyprogesterone, with 21-hydroxylase catalyzing the reaction, and an intermediate product towards the cortisol pathway. Reduced 21-hydroxylase activity leads to decreased levels of 11-deoxycortisol, but not all laboratories specify a minimum reference value it since it is mostly used as a biomarker for 11β-hydroxylase deficiency, where 11-deoxycortisol levels increase dramatically, so the laboratories may only specify the maximum reference value.

== Treatment ==
=== Prenatal treatment ===
Clinical Practice Guidelines advise that clinicians continue to regard prenatal therapy as experimental.

Because the period during which fetal genitalia may become virilized begins about 6 weeks after conception, prenatal treatment to avoid virilization must be started by 6 to 7 weeks.

==== Application of dexamethasone in prenatal treatment ====
Adrenal glands of female fetuses with CAH begin producing excess androgens by the 9th week of gestation. The most important aspects of virilization (urogenital closure and phallic urethra) occur between 8 and 12 weeks. Theoretically, if enough glucocorticoid could be supplied to the fetus to reduce adrenal androgen biosynthesis by the 9th week, virilization could be prevented and the difficult decision about timing of surgery avoided.

The challenge of preventing severe virilization of girls is twofold: detection of CAH at the beginning of the pregnancy, and delivery of an effective amount of glucocorticoid to the fetus without causing harm to the mother.

The first problem has not yet been entirely solved, but it has been shown that if dexamethasone is taken by a pregnant woman, enough can cross the placenta to suppress fetal adrenal function.

At present no program screens for risk in families who have not yet had a child with CAH. For families desiring to avoid virilization of a second child, the current strategy is to start dexamethasone as soon as a pregnancy has been confirmed even though at that point the chance that the pregnancy is a girl with CAH is only 12.5%. Dexamethasone is taken by the mother each day until it can be safely determined whether she is carrying an affected girl.

Whether the fetus is an affected girl can be determined by chorionic villus sampling at 9–11 weeks of gestation, or by amniocentesis at 15–18 weeks gestation. In each case the fetal sex can be determined quickly, and if the fetus is a male the dexamethasone can be discontinued. If female, fetal DNA is analyzed to see if she carries one of the known abnormal alleles of the CYP21 gene. If so, dexamethasone is continued for the remainder of the pregnancy at a dose of about 1 mg daily.

Most mothers who have followed this treatment plan have experienced at least mild cushingoid effects from the glucocorticoid but have borne daughters whose genitalia are much less virilized.

Dexamethasone is used as an off-label early prenatal treatment for the symptoms of CAH in female fetuses, but it does not treat the underlying congenital disorder. A 2007 Swedish clinical trial found that treatment may cause cognitive and behavioural defects, but the small number of test subjects means the study cannot be considered definitive. A 2012 American study found no negative short-term outcomes, but "lower cognitive processing in CAH girls and women with long-term dexamethasone exposure." Administration of pre-natal dexamethasone has been the subject of controversy over issues of informed consent and because treatment must predate a clinical diagnosis of CAH in the female fetus, especially because in utero dexamethasone may cause metabolic problems that are not evident until later in life; Swedish clinics ceased recruitment for research in 2010.

The treatment has also raised concerns in LGBT and bioethics communities following the publication of an essay posted to the forum of the Hastings Center, and research in the Journal of Bioethical Inquiry, which found that pre-natal treatment of female fetuses was suggested to prevent those fetuses from becoming lesbians after birth, may make them more likely to engage in "traditionally" female-identified behavior and careers, and more interested in bearing and raising children. Citing a known attempt by a man using his knowledge of the fraternal birth order effect to avoid having a homosexual son by using a surrogate, the essayists (Alice Dreger, Ellen Feder, Anne Tamar-Mattis) suggest that prenatal dexamethasone treatments constitute the first known attempt to use in utero protocols to reduce the incidence of homosexuality and bisexuality in humans. Research on the use of prenatal hormone treatments to prevent homosexuality stretches back to the early 1990s or earlier.

Since CAH is a recessive gene, both the mother and father must be recessive carriers of CAH for a child to have CAH. Due to advances in modern medicine, those couples with the recessive CAH genes have an option to prevent CAH in their offspring through preimplantation genetic diagnosis (PGD). In PGD, the egg is fertilized outside the woman's body in a Petri dish (IVF). On the 3rd day, when the embryo has developed from one cell to about 4 to 6 cells, one of those cells is removed from the embryo without harming the embryo. The embryo continues to grow until day 5 when it is either frozen or implanted into the mother. Meanwhile, the removed cell is analyzed to determine if the embryo has CAH. If the embryo is determined to have CAH, the parents may decide as to whether they wish to have it implanted in the mother or not.

Meta-analysis of the studies supporting the use of dexamethasone on CAH at-risk fetuses found "less than one half of one percent of published 'studies' of this intervention were regarded as being of high enough quality to provide meaningful data for a meta-analysis. Even these four studies were of low quality ... in ways so slipshod as to breach professional standards of medical ethics" and "there were no data on long-term follow-up of physical and metabolic outcomes in children exposed to dexamethasone".

=== Long-term management of CAH ===
Management of infants and children with CAH is complex and warrants long-term care in a pediatric endocrine clinic. After the diagnosis is confirmed, and any salt-wasting crisis averted or reversed, major management issues include:

1. Initiating and monitoring hormone replacement
2. Stress coverage, crisis prevention, parental education
3. Reconstructive surgery
4. Optimizing growth
5. Optimizing androgen suppression and fertility in women with CAH

Management of adults with CAH should take into consideration the side effects of long-term glucocorticoid exposure, such as cardiovascular morbidities.

==== Hormone replacement ====
The primary goals of hormone replacement are to protect from adrenal insufficiency and to suppress the excessive adrenal androgen production.

Glucocorticoids are provided to all children and adults with all but the mildest and latest-onset forms of CAH. The glucocorticoids provide a reliable substitute for cortisol, thereby reducing ACTH levels. Reducing ACTH also reduces the stimulus for continued hyperplasia and overproduction of androgens. In other words, glucocorticoid replacement is the primary method of reducing the excessive adrenal androgen production in both sexes. A number of glucocorticoids are available for therapeutic use. Hydrocortisone or liquid prednisolone is preferred in infancy and childhood, and prednisone or dexamethasone are often more convenient for adults.

The glucocorticoid dose is typically started at the low end of physiologic replacement (6–12 mg/m^{2}) but is adjusted throughout childhood to prevent both growth suppression from too much glucocorticoid and androgen escape from too little. Serum levels of 17OHP, testosterone, androstenedione, and other adrenal steroids are followed for additional information, but may not be entirely normalized even with optimal treatment. As regular monitoring is needed, patients can be monitored non-invasively by measuring 17OHP and androstenedione in saliva. (See Glucocorticoid for more on this topic.) However, the currently used glucocorticoid therapy methods may lead to unphysiological doses that, in addition to the problems caused by overexposure to androgens, can harm health. Various clinical results, besides the steroids, require regular monitoring. The negative consequences are primarily the result of non-physiological glucocorticoid replacement. During illness or physical or mental stress, the demand for cortisol can increase, sometimes leading to adrenal crises. As current glucocorticoid therapy regiments fail to replicate the physiologic circadian rhythm and the glucocorticoids are often administered at a higher dose to treat androgen excess, the long-term consequences of the therapy, such as decreased bone density and an increased cardiometabolic risk profile, should be addressed; other consequences of CAH such as impaired quality of life and affected mental health should be taken into consideration; periodic assessments and monitoring of patients should take place in specialized centers to detect and treat potential complications early. Clinical studies are underway to find ways to better mimic the normal circadian rhythm of cortisol secretion and to reduce the total dose of glucocorticoids.

Mineralocorticoids are replaced in all infants with salt-wasting and in most patients with elevated renin levels. Fludrocortisone is the only pharmaceutically available mineralocorticoid and is usually used in doses of 0.05 to 2 mg daily. Electrolytes, renin, and blood pressure levels are followed to optimize the dose.

===== Stress coverage, crisis prevention, parental education =====
Even after diagnosis and initiation of treatment, a small percentage of children and adults with infancy or childhood-onset CAH die from adrenal crisis. Deaths from this are entirely avoidable if the child and family understand that daily glucocorticoid treatment cannot be allowed to be interrupted when ill. When a person is healthy, missing a dose, or even several doses, may only produce few immediate symptoms. Glucocorticoid requirements increase in response to illness, and during times of stress. Meaning that missing doses of glucocorticoids, while being sick with influenza, or viral gastroenteritis for instance, can cause an adrenal crisis. In which hypotension, shock, and death, can all occur.

To prevent this, individuals taking replacement glucocorticoids are taught to increase their doses in the event of illness, surgery, severe injury, or severe exhaustion. More importantly, they are taught that vomiting warrants an injection within hours of hydrocortisone (e.g., Solu-Cortef) or another glucocorticoid. This recommendation applies to both children and adults. Because young children are more susceptible to vomiting illnesses than adults, pediatric endocrinologists usually teach parents how to give hydrocortisone injections.

As an additional precaution, persons with adrenal insufficiency are advised to wear a medical identification tag or carry a wallet card to alert those who may be providing emergency medical care of the urgent need for glucocorticoids.

==== Reconstructive surgery ====
Surgery need never be considered for genetically male (XY) infants because the excess androgens do not produce anatomic abnormality. However, surgery for severely virilized XX infants is often performed and has become a subject of debate.

Surgical reconstruction of abnormal genitalia has been offered to parents of severely virilized girls with CAH since the first half of the 20th century. The purposes of surgery have generally been a combination of the following:

1. To make the external genitalia look more female than male;
2. To make it possible for these girls to participate in normal sexual intercourse when they grow up;
3. To improve their chances of fertility;
4. To reduce the frequency of urinary infections.

In the 1950s and 1960s, surgery often involved clitorectomy (removal of most of the clitoris), an operation that also reduced genital sensation. In the 1970s, new operative methods were developed to preserve innervation and clitoral function. However, several retrospective surveys in the last decade suggest that (1) sexual enjoyment is reduced in many women even after nerve-sparing procedures, and (2) women with CAH who have not had surgery also have a substantial rate of sexual dysfunction. (See Intersex surgery for an overview of procedures and potential complications, and History of intersex surgery for a fuller discussion of the controversies.) Many patient advocates and surgeons argue for deferring surgery until adolescence or later, while some surgeons continue to argue that infant surgery has advantages.

==== Optimizing growth in CAH ====
The optimal concentration of adrenal androgens for normal growth, puberty, and bone health is unclear.

One of the challenging aspects of long-term management is optimizing growth so that a child with CAH achieves his or her height potential because both undertreatment and overtreatment can reduce growth or the remaining time for growth. While glucocorticoids are essential for health, dosing is always a matter of approximation. In even mildly excessive amounts, glucocorticoids slow growth. On the other hand, adrenal androgens are readily converted to estradiol, which accelerates bone maturation and can lead to early epiphyseal closure. This narrow target of optimal dose is made more difficult to obtain by the imperfect replication of normal diurnal plasma cortisol levels produced by 2 or 3 oral doses of hydrocortisone. As a consequence, average height losses of about 4 inches (10 cm) have been reported with traditional management.

Traditionally, pediatric endocrinologists have tried to optimize growth by measuring a child every few months to assess current rate of growth, by checking the bone age every year or two, by periodically measuring 17OHP and testosterone levels as indicators of adrenal suppression, and by using hydrocortisone for glucocorticoid replacement rather than longer-acting prednisone or dexamethasone.

The growth problem is even worse in the simple virilizing forms of CAH which are detected when premature pubic hair appears in childhood because the bone age is often several years advanced at the age of diagnosis. While a boy (or girl) with simple virilizing CAH is taller than peers at that point, he will have far fewer years remaining to grow and may go from being a very tall 7-year-old to a 62-inch 13-year-old who has completed growth. Even with adrenal suppression, many of these children will have already had central precocious puberty triggered by the prolonged exposure of the hypothalamus to the adrenal androgens and estrogens. If this has begun, it may be advantageous to suppress puberty with a gonadotropin-releasing hormone agonist such as leuprolide to slow continuing bone maturation.

In recent years some newer approaches to optimizing growth have been researched and are beginning to be used. The effects of androgens on the body can be reduced by blocking the receptors with an antiandrogen such as flutamide and by reducing the conversion of testosterone to estradiol. This conversion is mediated by aromatase and can be inhibited by aromatase blockers such as testolactone. Blocking the effects and conversions of estrogens will allow the use of lower doses of glucocorticoids with less risk of acceleration of bone maturation. Other proposed interventions have included bilateral adrenalectomy to remove the androgen sources, or growth hormone treatment to enhance growth.

==== Preventing hyperandrogenism and optimizing fertility ====
As growth ends, management in girls with CAH changes focus to optimizing reproductive function. Both excessive androgens from the adrenals and excessive glucocorticoid treatment can disrupt ovulation, resulting in irregularity of menses or amenorrhea, as well as infertility. Continued monitoring of hormone balance and careful readjustment of glucocorticoid dose can usually restore fertility, but as a group, women with CAH have a lower fertility rate than a comparable population.

Classical CAH has little effect on male fertility unless an adult stops taking his glucocorticoid medication entirely for an extended time, in which case excessive adrenal androgens may reduce testicular production as well as spermatogenesis. Regarding nonclassic CAH, glucocorticoid therapy is typically not necessary for lifelong management. However, in certain cases, this treatment may be required to address fertility issues such as oligomenorrhea, amenorrhea, or difficulty conceiving. About 90% of women with nonclassic CAH remain undiagnosed. Once attempting to conceive, approximately 83% of women win nonclassic CAH successfully achieve pregnancy within one year, irrespective of whether they receive glucocorticoid therapy or not, but the therapy reduces the risk of miscarriage.

==== Psychosexual development and issues ====
Nearly all mammals display sex-dimorphic reproductive and sexual behavior (e.g., lordosis and mounting in rodents). Much research has made it clear that prenatal and early postnatal androgens play a role in the differentiation of most mammalian brains. Experimental manipulation of androgen levels in utero or shortly after birth can alter adult reproductive behavior.

Girls and women with CAH constitute the majority of genetic females with normal internal reproductive hormones who have been exposed to male levels of androgens throughout their prenatal lives. Milder degrees of continuing androgen exposure continue throughout childhood and adolescence as a consequence of the imperfections of current glucocorticoid treatment for CAH. The psychosexual development of these girls and women has been analyzed as evidence of the role of androgens in human sex-dimorphic behaviors.

In comparison to unaffected individuals, patients with classical CAH exhibit a greater prevalence of anxiety disorders, depressive disorders, alcohol misuse, personality disorders, and suicidal tendencies in males, while females are more prone to adjustment disorders. In comparison to the general population, individuals with CAH have a higher prevalence of substance abuse and attention deficit–hyperactivity disorder (ADHD). This pattern is particularly observed in females with the most severe null genotype and males who receive a diagnosis after the neonatal period.

Girls with CAH have repeatedly been reported to spend more time with "sex-atypical" toys and "rough-and-tumble" play than unaffected sisters. These differences continue into adolescence, as expressed in social behaviors, leisure activities, and career interests. Interest in babies and becoming mothers is significantly lower by most measures. Avoidance of romantic relationships is common in women and men with classical CAH.

Gender identity of girls and women with CAH is most frequently observed to be female. Sexual orientation is more mixed, though the majority are heterosexual. In one study, 27% of women with CAH were rated as bisexual in their orientations.

A 2020 survey of 57 females with life-long experience of CAH and 132 parents of females with CAH in the United States revealed that the majority of participants do not consider females with CAH to be intersex, and oppose a legal intersex designation of females with CAH.

Cognitive effects are less clear. Altered fetal and postnatal exposure to androgens, as well as glucocorticoid therapy, affect brain development and function. Compared to healthy girls, those with classical CAH have more aggressive behavior but better spatial navigation abilities, and the amygdala activation patterns differ between affected and healthy girls. Glucocorticoid therapy in CAH impairs working memory and causes brain changes, including white matter hyperintensities, suggesting a reduction in white matter structural integrity. Cognitive impairment, when observed, has occasionally been attributed to hypoglycemia and electrolyte imbalances at the initial presentation. A 2023 population-based cohort study of 714 patients with classical CAH and 71400 control subjects predict that patients with CAH have an increased prevalence of injuries and accidents, especially females, but the cause is not known.

The increased prevalence of depressive and anxiety disorders, along with the prescription of antidepressants by medical practitioners, among youth with CAH in comparison to the general population indicates the potential necessity for screening for symptoms of depression and anxiety in this specific population.

Given that people with CAH exhibit a higher incidence and severity of behavioral symptoms, and that the manifestation of these behavioral problems can be attributed to excessive endogenous androgen exposure and side effects of glucocorticoid therapy, emphasis should be placed on early optimization of CAH management to mitigate the psychological ramifications that may ensue.

== Prognosis ==
The outcomes and prognosis for CAH (congenital adrenal hyperplasia) can vary depending on several factors, such as the specific type of CAH, its severity, early detection, and proper management. With appropriate medical care and ongoing treatment, individuals with CAH can lead healthy lives. Consistent monitoring and adherence to treatment are important for good outcomes.

Children with CAH often experience increased height during early childhood, but their final adult height tends to be shorter than expected. Advanced bone age and early fusion of growth plates due to excess androgens contribute to this outcome. Additionally, glucocorticoid treatment for CAH can affect growth and result in decreased final height. Experimental treatments using growth hormone and luteinizing hormone-releasing hormone analogs have shown some success in increasing average height gains by approximately 7.3 cm. Most children with CAH have normal neuropsychological development, although there may be differences in gendered play activities influenced by prenatal sex steroid exposure.

While bone density is typically normal in most patients, metabolic abnormalities such as obesity, insulin resistance, dyslipidemia (abnormal blood lipid levels), and polyendocrine metabolic ovarian syndrome (PMOS) are more prevalent either due to the disease itself or long-term glucocorticoid treatment.

Fertility is possible for both males and females with CAH but may be reduced due to multiple factors encompassing biology, psychology, social influences, and sexual aspects.

Management of CAH requires collaboration among different subspecialty professionals considering the complex nature of the disease's complications and long-term consequences.

== Incidence and variants ==
According to most studies, the global incidence of classical forms ranges from about 1:14,000 to 1:18,000 births, based on newborn screening programs and national case registries, but this situation is more common in small genetically isolated populations with small gene pools. 10% of patients with classical forms of CAH have CAH-X syndrome, which is marked by the presence of CAH features along with features indicative of hypermobility-type Ehlers–Danlos syndrome. This condition results from a contiguous gene deletion that impacts both CYP21A2 and TNXB genes.

The incidence of nonclassical forms of CAH is 1:200 to 1:1000 based on various estimates, and is also higher in groups of people with a high rate of marriage between relatives, up to 1:50. Nonclassic CAH may be identified incidentally during the assessment of oligomenorrhea, amenorrhea, and infertility in females. However, a significant proportion, approximately 90%, of women with nonclassic CAH remain undiagnosed. As for men with nonclassic CAH, their asymptomatic nature commonly leads to underdiagnosis.

== History ==
In 19th Century, cases of CAH were reported, leading to the understanding that the adrenal gland influenced sexual phenotypes as well as being mysteriously required for survival.

In 1865, CAH in its non-salt-wasting form was thoroughly described for the first time by a Neapolitan pathologist Luigi De Crecchio. However, significant strides in understanding and treating the condition have been made over the years.

In the early 20th Century, numerous adrenal steroids were isolated, and bioassays eventually distinguished glucocorticoids, mineralocorticoids, and androgens.

In 1950, Wilkins, Bartter, and Albright introduced cortisone to treat CAH, which began a period of pediatric adrenal research. Through careful clinical research, Wilkins established modern methods of treating CAH.

In 1957, Alfred Bongiovanni noticed a defect in 21-hydroxylation in CAH, followed by defects in 3β-hydroxysteroid dehydrogenase and 11β-hydroxylase.

P450 enzymes were described from 1962 to 1964, and 21-hydroxylation was the first identified activity of P450s.

In the last quarter of the 20th Century, researchers who contributed to CAH knowledge include Hans Selye, who studied stress responses and adrenal function, as well as Maria New, who conducted extensive research on prenatal treatment options for CAH.

From 1984 to 2004, the techniques of molecular genetics were applied to work out the genetic and biochemical bases of CAH.

== Society and culture ==
Society's understanding of CAH can vary widely, leading to different perceptions and attitudes toward individuals with the condition. Lack of awareness or misconceptions about CAH may contribute to stigma or discrimination.

Discussions around intersex conditions have evolved over time as societal understanding has progressed. There is a consensus that classical CAH is an intersex condition. However, for the nonclassical CAH, there is a debate on whether it can be considered an intersex condition. Anne Fausto-Sterling, an American sexologist, in a 2000 book Sexing the Body, came up with an estimate that people with intersex conditions account for 1.7% of the general population. This estimate is cited by a number of prominent intersex advocacy organizations. Of these intersex individuals, according to Fausto-Sterling, 88% have nonclassical CAH. Leonard Sax, an American psychologist and a family physician, criticized these figures in a review published in 2002 in the Journal of Sex Research, stating that from the clinician's perspective, nonclassical CAH is not an intersex condition. Including nonclassical CAH in intersex prevalence estimates has been cited by Joel Best, a professor of sociology and criminal justice, in a 2013 book Stat-Spotting: A Field Guide to Identifying Dubious Data, as an example of misleading statistical practice.

Different cultural contexts may shape views on gender identity, sexuality, and medical interventions for intersex conditions. Individuals with visible differences or unique health needs associated with CAH may face social stigmatization due to a lack of awareness, prejudice, or preconceived notions about intersexuality.

Activists, such as Hida Viloria, who was born with a form of CAH, advocate for compassionate care for people born intersex.

== Research directions ==
Gene therapy is an experimental therapeutic approach that aims to correct the underlying genetic defect responsible for a particular condition. In the context of CAH, caused by mutations in the CYP21A2 gene, gene replacement therapy involves introducing a functional copy of this gene into the cells where this gene is expressed. The goal is to normalize the production of 21-hydroxylase, the enzyme encoded by CYP21A2. Providing a working copy of this gene may improve adrenal hormone synthesis and subsequently normalize cortisol and aldosterone production.

Currently, gene replacement therapy for CAH is still at an early stage of research and development. Various approaches are being explored, including using viral vectors carrying a healthy copy of the CYP21A2 gene to deliver it into target cells. Another approach is based on utilizing human embryonic stem cells (hESCs) or induced pluripotent stem cells (iPSCs) to generate steroid-producing cells that can potentially replace or supplement dysfunctional adrenal tissue in individuals with CAH. However, it remains unclear how new approaches can be tested, as there are even no experimental models yet for this disease for gene therapy.

== See also ==
- Inborn errors of steroid metabolism
- Congenital adrenal hyperplasia
- Adrenal insufficiency
- Disorders of sexual development
- Intersexuality, pseudohermaphroditism, and ambiguous genitalia
- 21-Hydroxylase
