= Mary C. Rawlinson =

American philosopher

- Born: Mary Crenshaw Rawlinson
- Other name: Mary Rawlinson
- Known for: Feminist Bioethics

Academic background
- Education: Vanderbilt University (1969–1973); Northwestern University (PhD)
- Thesis: Identity and Differing: Husserl's Doctrine of Self-Constitution (1978)

Academic work
- Institutions: Stony Brook University

Mary Crenshaw Rawlinson is a professor of philosophy at Stony Brook University in New York and a research fellow at the University College London (UCL) Institute of Advanced Studies (IAS).

== Life ==
Rawlinson published "The concept of a feminist bioethics" in 2001 in which she argued that the "invisible gendering of the universal renders the other gender invisible and silent". In 2006 she started the IJFAB: International Journal of Feminist Approaches to Bioethics. She was the editor until 2016, and is still a member of the advisory board. Between 2007 and 2017, Rawlinson was the co-founder and co-director of The Irigaray Circle.

Much of her work focusses on Hegel, Irigaray, bioethics and feminist ideologies. Her published materials cover the philosophical disciplines of metaphysics, phenomenology and psychoanalysis. She has also written extensively on literary theory and criticism within the purview of continental philosophy. Her book, The Betrayal of Substance assesses Hegel's Phenomenology of Spirit, arguing that whilst some of his theory is sound, Hegel experienced limitations in separating consciousness from sensory existence.

Within her scope of philosophy, Mary Rawlinson has received critical success and numerous responses on sites such as the Canadian Society for Continental Philosophy, the Dictionary of Open Access Journal and her former website, IJFAB.

== Selected publications ==
- The Voice of Breast Cancer in Medicine and Bioethics (Springer, 2006)
- Thinking with Irigaray (SUNY, 2011)
- Labor and Global Justice (Lexington, 2014)
- Global Food, Global Justice (Cambridge Scholars Press, 2015)
- Just Life: bioethics and the future of sexual difference (Columbia University Press, 2016)
- Engaging the World: Thinking After Irigaray (SUNY, 2016)
- The Betrayal of Substance: death, literature, and sexual difference in Hegel's Phenomenology of Spirit (Columbia University Press, 2021)
- What Is Sexual Difference: Thinking After Irigaray (Columbia University Press, 2024)
- Opening Hegel's Autological Circle: Irigaray and the Metaphysics of Sexual Difference (What is Sexual Difference? 2023)
- Justice in an Unjust World: The Politics of Narration in Luce Irigaray and Frank Miller's Sin City (SUNY, 2023)
- The Routledge Handbook of Food Ethics (Routledge, 2016)
- Women's Work: Ethics, Homecooking and the Sexual Politics of Food (Routledge, 2016)
- The Climate of Food: Justice, Truth and Structural Change (Environment and Climate Change: Justice at the Intersections, 2012)
- Women's Rights, Human Rights: Rethinking the Universal in Bioethics (Feminist Bioethics, 2010)
- Derrida and Feminism (Routledge, 1997), Editor (Co-Credited with Ellen K Feder and Emily Zakin)
- Foucault' Strategy: knowledge, power, and the specificity of truth (Journal of Medicine and Philosophy, 1987)
- THE SENSE OF SUFFERING* Better to suffer than to die: that is mankind's motto (Journal of Medicine and Philosophy, 1986)
- Hegel on Forgiveness (Oxford University Press)
