= Christiane Völling =

German intersex activist

- Born: 17 April 1959 (age 67)
- Known for: Intersex litigant and author

Christiane Völling (born 17 April 1959) is the first intersex person known to have successfully sued for damages in a case brought for non-consensual surgical intervention, described as a non-consensual reassignment. She was awarded €100,000 by the Regional Court of Cologne.

== History ==
Völling was born in 1959 with XX sex chromosomes, typically associated with being female, and likely also with congenital adrenal hyperplasia. She had ambiguous genitalia and was assigned and raised male. She had an early puberty with what was considered to be striking physical growth, including beard growth.

During an appendectomy, at age 14, the teenager was found to have a full set of female reproductive organs, including ovaries and fallopian tubes. While no testicular tissue was detected, Völling was diagnosed as having a mix of both male and female organs. She was informed of the presence of female organs and told she was 60% female. Völling suffered mental health issues as a consequence. Her female-typical chromosomal pattern was detected in 1977, but the results were not shared with her. Her awareness of her sexuality and her sexual orientation were analysed, followed by surgery at age 18 on 12 August 1977 that removed her female sexual organs, including her reproductive organs. Medical papers showed purpose of the surgery as a "testovarectomy", the removal of both testicular and ovarian tissue, however, no testicular tissue was present. The senior physician’s entry stated “a normal female anatomy with pre-pubertal uterus, normal sized ovaries, blindly ending vagina...” were found.

Völling continued to live as a man for a time, but later transitioned to live as a woman. In 2006, Völling obtained her medical records and discovered the concealment of her chromosomal diagnosis, and the nature of the surgery in 1977.

== The case of Re: Völling ==
In a case decided on 6 February 2008, in the Regional Court of Cologne, Völling stated that she had been unable to consent to, or fully understand, the nature of the surgery that took place in 1977. She argued that, with appropriate medical treatment, she could have lived the life of a woman, including full female sexuality and the ability to procreate. In addition to life in an inappropriate gender, she suffered the consequences of castration, and of a urethral reconstruction, including persistent urinary tract infections and urinary dysfunction.

The surgeon argued that he relied on the diagnostic support of medical specialists. He further argued that Völling did not possess a "naturally female body", but one subjected to virilization, and "profoundly atrophied" sex organs." In the surgeon's view, the surgery fulfilled the urgent and thoroughly reviewed wishes of the patient. Key diagnostic information was withheld for therapeutic reasons, primarily due to concern about her mental health.

The court determined that the surgery took place in the absence of any grave or acute health risks. The doctor had no good reason for failing to provide full diagnostic information, in particular as the diagnostic data showed that Völling did not possess mixed sex characteristics, with the potential to maintain one present sex, but that the surgery actually involved the complete removal of her only present sex organs. Völling was both genetically and physically female. An obligation to inform the patient about her diagnoses could not be disregarded for therapeutic reasons as the "surgery's point of origin considerably changed during the surgery".

The court ruled that "the Defendant illegally, in a deliberate and culpable manner, injured the Plaintiff’s health by removing his female sex organs" without full consent about the nature, content and extent of the surgery. Völling was awarded damages of €100,000.

The International Commission of Jurists describe the case as "an example of an individual who was subjected to sex reassignment surgery without full knowledge or consent". The case fell just within limits afforded by the statute of limitations.

In addition to the case, Völling petitioned a court for her official change of name and change of legal status from male to female.

== Publications ==
Völling, Christiane (25 August 2010). Ich war Mann und Frau. Mein Leben als Intersexuelle [I Was Man and Woman. My Life as an Intersexual] (in German). Fackelträger Verlag. ISBN 978-3-7716-4455-0.

== See also ==
- Intersex rights in Germany
- Intersex human rights
- Intersex surgery
