= Kirsten Sandberg =

- Born: 23 April 1954 (age 71)
- Occupation: Professor of Law
- Known for: Jurist and child rights expert

Kirsten Sandberg (born 23 April 1954) is a Norwegian jurist and expert on the rights of children. She has served as Acting Supreme Court Justice in Norway, and has performed as chair of the Chair of the United Nations Committee on the Rights of the Child.

== Career ==
Sandberg is Professor of Law at the University of Oslo Faculty of Law, with over 25 years of experience as a child law specialist. She has been a member and Chair of the United Nations Committee on the Rights of the Child. She served as Acting Supreme Court Justice in the Supreme Court of Norway 2010–2011, and was in 2011 elected a member of the United Nations Committee on the Rights of the Child as the nominee of the Government of Norway.

From 2012 she is also Pro-Dean for Education of the Faculty of Law. She has been a visiting fellow at the European University Institute in Florence and the University of Chicago.

== Selected works ==
- Sandberg, Kirsten (October 2015). "The Rights of LGBTI Children under the Convention on the Rights of the Child". Nordic Journal of Human Rights. 33 (4): 337–352. doi:10.1080/18918131.2015.1128701. ISSN 1891-8131.
- Kirsten Sandberg, Njål Høstmælingen, Elin Saga Kjørholt: Barnekonvensjonen : barns rettigheter i Norge. Universitetsforlaget 2008 (ISBN 978-82-15-01193-6)
- Kirsten Sandberg: Tilbakeføring av barn etter omsorgsovertakelse. Gyldendal Akademisk 2003 (ISBN 82-05-31496-9)
