= Anne Tamar-Mattis =

American human rights advocate

- Education: Brown University (BA) University of California, Berkeley School of Law (JD)
- Occupations: Attorney, advocate, author
- Years active: 2001-present
- Known for: Intersex advocacy, founder of interACT

Anne Tamar-Mattis is an American attorney, human rights advocate, and founder of interACT (formerly Advocates for Informed Choice). She currently serves as interACT's Legal Director.

== Career ==
Tamar-Mattis spent six years as the Director of the National Youth Talkline at Lavender Youth Recreation & Information Center, a national peer-support line for LGBT youth. She became the first Program Director for the San Francisco LGBT Community Center in 2001. In 2003, she took a hiatus to attend law school and graduated from the University of California, Berkeley School of Law in 2006.

Tamar-Mattis founded interACT with the support of fellowships from Equal Justice Works (2006) and Echoing Green (2008). She has been an adjunct professor at the University of California, Berkeley School of Law since 2008 where she teaches Sexual Orientation & the Law.

== Selected bibliography ==
Tamar-Mattis' selected publications include:

- Tamar-Mattis, A. (August 2014). "Patient advocate responds to DSD surgery debate". Journal of Pediatric Urology. 10 (4): 788–789. doi:10.1016/j.jpurol.2014.03.019. ISSN 1477-5131. PMID 24909610.
- Tamar-Mattis, Anne; Baratz, Arlene; Baratz Dalke, Katharine; Karkazis, Katrina (January 2014). "Emotionally and cognitively informed consent for clinical care for differences of sex development". Psychology and Sexuality. 5 (1): 44–55. doi:10.1080/19419899.2013.831215. ISSN 1941-9899. S2CID 144006437.
- Tamar-Mattis, Anne (2014). "Medical Treatment of People with intersex conditions as Torture and cruel, inhuman, or Degrading Treatment or Punishment". Torture in Healthcare Settings: Reflections on the Special Rapporteur on Torture's 2013 Thematic Report. Washington, DC: Center for Human Rights & Humanitarian Law. pp. 91–104. Archived from the original on 2016-03-14.
- Feder, Ellen K.; Dreger, Alice; Tamar-Mattis, Anne (March 2013). "More Rhetoric Than Argument?". Hastings Center Report. 43 (2): 4–6. doi:10.1002/hast.148. ISSN 0093-0334. PMID 23494692.
- Tamar-Mattis, Anne (October 30, 2012). "The Dex Diaries, Part 9: The Real Silent Majority". Psychology Today.
- Dreger, Alice; Feder, Ellen K.; Tamar-Mattis, Anne (September 2012). "Prenatal Dexamethasone for Congenital Adrenal Hyperplasia: An Ethics Canary in the Modern Medical Mine". Journal of Bioethical Inquiry. 9 (3): 277–294. doi:10.1007/s11673-012-9384-9. ISSN 1176-7529. PMC 3416978. PMID 22904609.
- Tamar-Mattis, Anne (April 19, 2012). "Sterilization and Minors with Intersex Conditions in California Law". California Law Review.
- Tamar-Mattis, Anne (February 2011). "DSD and genital surgery: Are caregivers failing the 'thank you' test?". Endocrine Today.
- Karkazis, Katrina; Tamar-Mattis, Anne; Kon, Alexander A. (August 2010). "Genital surgery for disorders of sex development: implementing a shared decision-making approach". Journal of Pediatric Endocrinology & Metabolism. 23 (8): 789–805. doi:10.1515/jpem.2010.129. ISSN 0334-018X. PMID 21073122. S2CID 2671659.
- Dreger, Alice; Feder, Ellen K; Tamar-Mattis, Anne (June 2010), Preventing Homosexuality (and Uppity Women) in the Womb?, The Hastings Center Bioethics Forum
- Tamar-Mattis, A. (2006). "Exceptions to the Rule: Curing the Law's Failure to Protect Intersex Infants". Berkeley Journal of Gender, Law & Justice. 21 (1): 59–110.

== Awards and recognition ==
In 2010, Anne Tamar-Mattis was recognized as an "unsung hero" by KQED Inc. 2011 saw her elected to the American Law Institute, and in 2012 Anne was awarded the Barbara Nachtrieb Armstrong Award for Outstanding Advocacy on Behalf of Social Justice for Women.

== Honours ==
In 2022, interACT awarded the Anne Tamar-Mattis Advocacy Award to American physician Arlene Baratz for being "an outstanding medical ally in the U.S. intersex movement and a parent of two intersex children".

== Personal life ==
Tamar-Mattis lives with her partner, intersex activist and physician, Suegee Tamar-Mattis. In 2012, they both appeared in the documentary film, Intersexion. They are parents of two children.
