= Heino Meyer-Bahlburg =

German-born psychologist (born 1940)

Heino F. L. Meyer-Bahlburg
- Born: 1940 (age 85–86)
- Known for: Work on biology of sexual orientation, gender identity, intersexuality, and HIV
- Scientific career
- Fields: Psychology
- Workplaces: University of Hamburg, University of Düsseldorf, State University of New York, Buffalo, Children's Hospital in Buffalo, New York, New York State Psychiatric Institute, Columbia University
- Thesis: Dr. rer. nat. in Psychology (1970)

Heino F. L. Meyer-Bahlburg (born 1940) is a German-born psychologist best known for his work on biology of sexual orientation, gender identity, intersexuality, and HIV.

== Education and career ==
Meyer-Bahlburg earned his Diplom from University of Hamburg in 1966 and his Dr. rer. nat. in Psychology from University of Düsseldorf in 1970. He took a position at State University of New York, Buffalo and at Children's Hospital in Buffalo, New York in 1970. Since 1977 he has held appointments at New York State Psychiatric Institute and Columbia University where he has been Professor of Clinical Psychology since 1990. In 1978, he took a position at New York Presbyterian Hospital and has been a Full Professional Psychologist there since 1990. Since 1987, he has been affiliated with the HIV Center for Clinical and Behavioral Studies.

Meyer-Bahlburg believes homosexuality may be an issue of brain chemistry. He has observed that women who took the synthetic estrogen Diethylstilbestrol when pregnant were more likely to have daughters with bisexual or homosexual tendencies. His research interests include the effect of biological factors, medical treatments, gender assignment, and rearing conditions in the development of gender-related behavior, temperament, sexual orientation, and gender identity in various forms of intersexuality. He has published on the effect of genital ambiguity and genital surgery on later sexual functioning in 46,XX congenital adrenal hyperplasia. Meyer-Bahlburg published with John Money and others on the topic of psychoneuroendocrinology and its effects on sexual orientation and gender identity. In collaboration with Maria New, Meyer-Bahlburg published a long term analysis of the psychological effects of the use of prenatal dexamethasone to treat Congenital Adrenal Hyperplasia.

Meyer-Bahlburg served on the American Psychiatric Association DSM-III Gender Identity Disorder Committee, and the DSM-IV Subcommittee on Gender Identity Disorders. He was also Adviser to the Sexual Disorder Text Revision Work Group for DSM-IV-TR. He treats gender identity disorder in children, taking about ten cases a year in the 1990s. He has written that gender identity depends largely on postnatal environmental influences, while sex-dimorphic behavior and temperamental sex differences appear to be modified by prenatal sex hormones. Meyer-Bahlburg notes that when parents bring in children for treatment, the "basic fear in this homophobic country is usually homosexuality."

His research interests in the field of HIV include psychosexual assessment, development and determinants of sexual risk behavior, and the effects of HIV on sexual functioning.

Meyer-Bahlburg was President of the International Academy of Sex Research from 1990 to 1991 and since 2002 has served on the Committee on Intersexuality for the Harry Benjamin International Gender Dysphoria Association.

== Selected publications ==
- Meyer-Bahlburg HFL (1990–1991). Will prenatal hormone treatment prevent homosexuality? Journal of Child and Adolescent Psychopharmacology. v.1 n. 4, 279-283.
- Meyer-Bahlburg HFL (1984). Psychoendocrine research on sexual orientation. Current status and future options. Prog Brain Res. 1984;61:375-98.
- Ehrhardt AA, Meyer-Bahlburg HFL, Rosen LR, Feldman JF, Veridiano NP, Zimmerman I, McEwen BS (1985). Sexual orientation after prenatal exposure to exogenous estrogen. Archives of Sexual Behavior Volume 14, Number 1 / February, 1985.
- Sandberg DE, Meyer-Bahlburg HFL, Yager TJ (1991). The Child Behavior Checklist Nonclinical Standardization Samples: Should They Be Utilized as Norms? Journal of the American Academy of Child & Adolescent Psychiatry. 30(1):124-134, January 1991.
- Cournos F, Guido JR, Coomaraswamy S, Meyer-Bahlburg HFL, Sugden R, Horwath E (1994). Sexual activity and risk of HIV infection among patients with schizophrenia. Am J Psychiatry. 1994 Feb;151(2):228-32.
- Trautman PD, Meyer-Bahlburg HFL, Postelnek J, and New MI (1995). Effects of early prenatal dexamethasone on the cognitive and behavioral development of young children: Results of a pilot study. Psychoneuroendocrinology Volume 20, Issue 4, 1995, Pages 439-449.
- Susser E, Valencia E, Miller M, Tsai WY, Meyer-Bahlburg HFL, Conover S (1995). Sexual behavior of homeless mentally ill men at risk for HIV. Am J Psychiatry. 1995 Apr;152(4):583-7.
- Meyer-Bahlburg HFL, Ehrhardt AA, Rosen LR, Gruen RS, Veridiano NP, Vann FH, Neuwalder HF (1995). Prenatal estrogens and the development of homosexual orientation. Developmental Psychology vol. 31, no 1 (140 p.) (1 p. 1/2), pp. 12–21.
- Rosario M, Meyer-Bahlburg HFL, Hunter J, Exner TM et al. (1996). The psychosexual development of urban lesbian, gay, and bisexual youths. Journal of Sex Research. Vol. 33(2) 113-126.
- Wisniewski AB, Migeon CJ, Meyer-Bahlburg HFL, Gearhart JP, Berkovitz GD, Brown TR, Money J (2000). Complete Androgen Insensitivity Syndrome: Long-Term Medical, Surgical, and Psychosexual Outcome1 (2000). The Journal of Clinical Endocrinology & Metabolism Vol. 85, No. 8 2664-2669.
- Meyer-Bahlburg HF (2001). Gender and sexuality in classic congenital adrenal hyperplasia. Endocrinol Metab Clin North Am. 2001 Mar;30(1):155-71, viii.
- O'Sullivan LF, Meyer-Bahlburg HFL, Watkins BX (2001). Mother-Daughter Communication about Sex among Urban African American and Latino Families. Journal of Adolescent Research, Vol. 16, No. 3, 269-292.
- Migeon CJ, Wisniewski AB, Gearhart JP, Meyer-Bahlburg HFL, Rock JA, Brown TR, Casella SJ, Maret A, MD*, Ngai KM, Money J, Berkovitz GD (2002). Ambiguous Genitalia With Perineoscrotal Hypospadias in 46,XY Individuals: Long-Term Medical, Surgical, and Psychosexual Outcome. Pediatrics Vol. 110 No. 3 September 2002, pp. e31.
