= Ellen Feder =

American philosopher

Ellen K. Feder
- Occupation: Philosopher
- Known for: Care Ethics; Continental Philosophy; Feminist and Critical Race theory

Academic work
- Discipline: Bioethics
- Sub-discipline: Feminism
- Institutions: American University

Ellen K. Feder is a professor emerita and the William Fraser McDowell Professor of Philosophy at American University in Washington, D.C.. She served on the Intersex Society of North America (ISNA) medical advisory board, and some of her lectures are publicly available on YouTube.

== Career ==
Feder was appointed the William Fraser McDowell Professor of Philosophy in September 1998. She joined the ISNA in 1999, after presenting a paper at the APA considering the medical management of intersex peoples and bioethics. Feder was a member of the society's Medical Advisory Board until its closure in 2008.

In 2013, Feder, along with other physicians, bioethicics and scholars published an article in the New England Medical Review and Journal agreeing with the Office for Human Research Protections (OHRP) that informed consent documents used in the Surfactant, Positive Pressure, and Oxygenation Randomized Trial (SUPPORT) were inadequate.

Feder is a member of the American Philosophical Association (APA), the Society for Phenomenology and Existential Philosophy (SPEP), the Society for Women in Philosophy (SWIP) and Feminist Ethics and Social Thought (FEAST).

== Selected publications ==
- Feminist theory and intersex activism: Thinking between and beyond (Philosophy Compass, 2021)
- When Racism Comes in Gray (Philosophy Today, 2020)
- Atypical Bodies in Medical Care (2017)
- Normalising Intersex Voices: Personal Stories from the Pages of NIB (Narrative Inquiry in Bioethics) (2016)
- Sex, Ethics and Method (2016)
- Caution Regarding German Law on Sex Assignment: Response to Parental Choice on Normalising Cosmetic Surgery (2015)
- Beyond Good Intentions (2015)
- Misrepresentation of Evidence Favoring Early Normalizing Surgery for Atypical Sex Anatomies (2015)
- Making Sense of Intersex: Changing Ethical Perspectives in Biomedicine (Bloomington: Indiana University Press, 2014)
- The OHRP and SUPPORT - Another View (2013)
- Power/Knowledge, Chapter in Michael Foucault: Key Concepts (Routledge, 2011)
- Family Bonds: Genealogies of Race and Gender (Oxford University Press, 2007: ISBN 978-0195314748)
- Of Monkeys and Men (Oxford University Press, 2007)
- A Passion for Wisdom: Readings in Western Philosophy on Love and Desire (Prentice Hall, 2004), Writer (Co-Credited with Karmen MacKendrick and Sybol Cook)
- The Subject of Care: Feminist Perspectives on Dependency (Rowman and Littlefield, 2002), Editor (Authored by Eva Feder Kittay)
- An Unsuitable Job for a Philosopher (Philosophy Today, 1999)
- Derrida and Feminism: Recasting the Question of Woman (Routledge, 1997), Editor (Co-Credited with Mary C Rawlinson and Emily Zakin)
