= Human penis =

Human male external reproductive organ

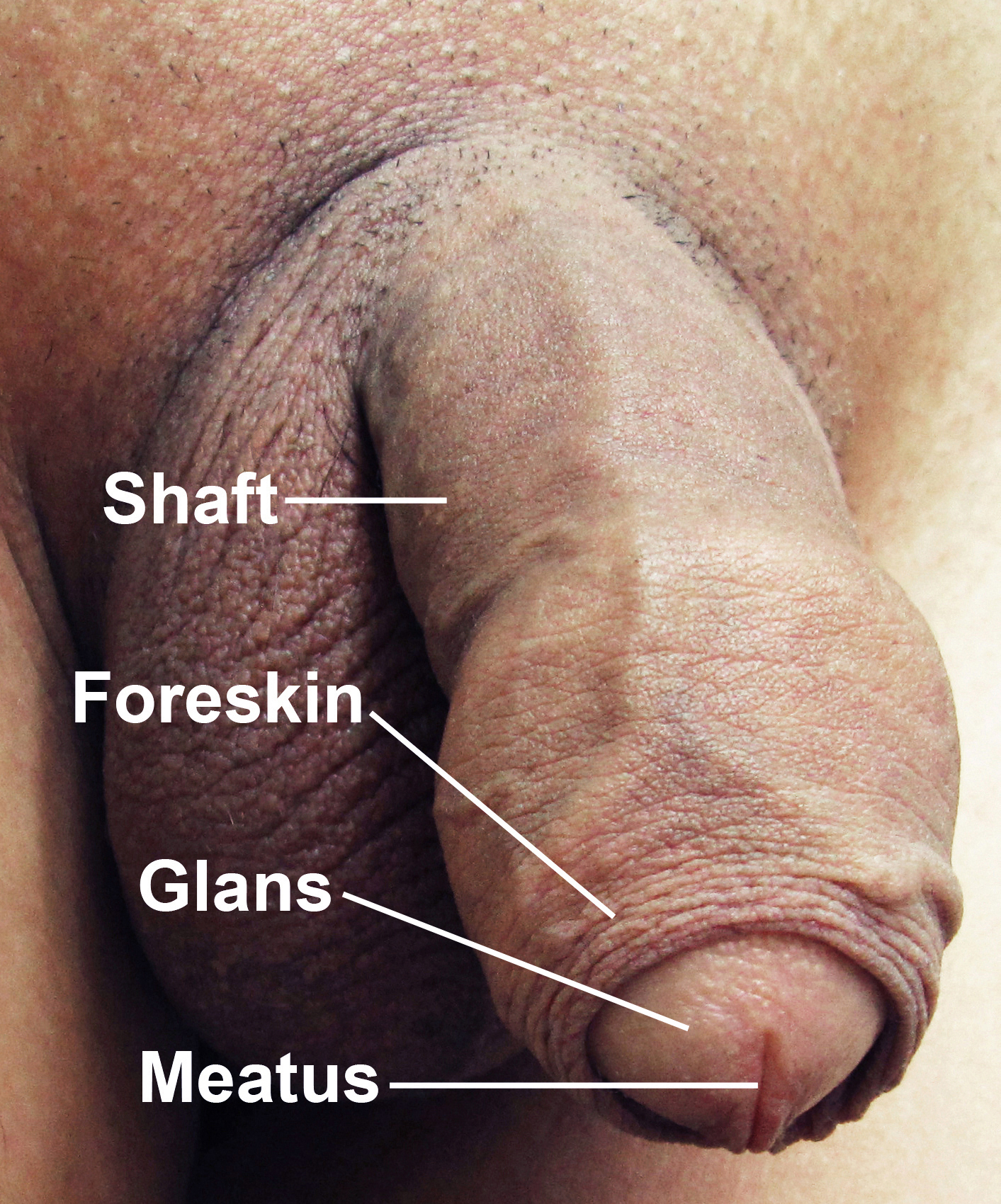
- A flaccid uncircumcised penis. Naturally occurring pubic hair has been deliberately removed to show anatomical detail.

Details
- Precursor: Genital tubercle, urogenital folds, urogenital sinus
- System: Genitourinary system, male reproductive system
- Artery: Dorsal artery of the penis, deep artery of the penis, artery of bulb, internal pudendal artery
- Vein: Deep dorsal vein, superficial dorsal vein of the penis, vein of bulb, internal pudendal veins
- Nerve: Dorsal nerve of the penis, pudendal nerve
- Lymph: Superficial inguinal lymph nodes

Identifiers
- Latin: penis, pudendum virile, membrum virile
- MeSH: D010413
- TA98: A09.4.01.001
- TA2: 3662
- FMA: 9707

In human anatomy, the penis (/ˈpiːnɪs/; pl.: penises or penes; from the Latin pēnis, initially 'tail') is an external sex organ (intromittent organ) through which males ejaculate and urinate. Together with the testes and surrounding structures, the penis functions as part of the male reproductive system.

The main parts of the penis are the root, body, the epithelium, including the shaft skin, and the foreskin covering the glans. The body of the penis is made up of three columns of tissue: two corpora cavernosa on the dorsal side and corpus spongiosum between them on the ventral side. The urethra passes through the prostate gland, where it is joined by the ejaculatory ducts, and then passes through the corpus spongiosum. The external opening of the urethra at the tip of the glans is the urinary meatus.

An erection is the stiffening expansion and orthogonal reorientation of the penis, which occurs during sexual arousal. Spontaneous erections frequently occur in non-sexual situations during adolescence and sleep. In its flaccid state, the penis is smaller, gives to pressure, and the glans is covered by the foreskin. In its fully erect state, the shaft becomes rigid and the glans becomes engorged, but not rigid. An erect penis may be straight or curved and may point at an upward angle, a downward angle, or straight ahead. As of 2015, the average erect human penis is 13.12 cm (5.17 in) long and has a circumference of 11.66 cm (4.59 in). Neither age nor size of the flaccid penis accurately predicts erectile length. There are several common body modifications to the penis, including circumcision.

The penis is homologous to the clitoris in females.

== Structure ==
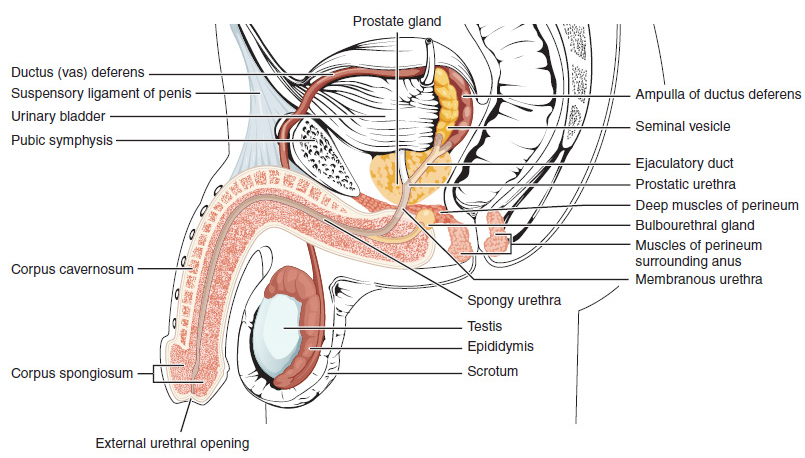
Lateral cross section of the penis

The three main parts of the human penis include:

- Root: It is the attached part, consisting of the bulb in the middle and the crura, one crus on either side of the bulb. It lies within the superficial perineal pouch. The crus is attached to the pubic arch.
- Shaft: The pendulous part of the penis. It has two surfaces: dorsal (posterosuperior in the erect penis) and ventral or urethral (facing downwards and backwards on the flaccid penis). The ventral surface is marked by the penile raphe. The base of the shaft is supported by the suspensory ligament, which is attached to the pubic symphysis.
- Epithelium of the penis consists of the shaft skin, the foreskin (prepuce), and the preputial mucosa on the inside of it. The foreskin covers and protects the glans and shaft. The epithelium is not attached to the underlying shaft, so it is free to glide to and fro.

The human penis is made up of three columns of erectile tissue: two corpora cavernosa lie next to each other (separated by a fibrous septum) on the dorsal side and one corpus spongiosum lies between them on the ventral side. These columns are surrounded by a fibrous layer of connective tissue called the tunica albuginea. The corpora cavernosa are innervated by lesser and greater cavernous nerves and form most of the penis containing blood vessels that fill with blood to help make an erection. The crura are the proximal parts of the corpora cavernosa. The corpus spongiosum is an erectile tissue surrounding the urethra. The proximal parts of the corpus spongiosum form the bulb and the distal ends form the glans penis.

The enlarged and bulbous-shaped end of the corpus spongiosum forms the glans penis with two specific types of sinusoids, which supports the foreskin, a loose fold of skin that in adults can retract to expose the glans. The area on the underside of the glans, where the foreskin is attached, is called the frenulum. The rounded base of the glans is called the corona. The inner surface of the foreskin and corona is rich in sebaceous glands which secrete smegma. The structure of the penis is supported by the pelvic floor muscles.

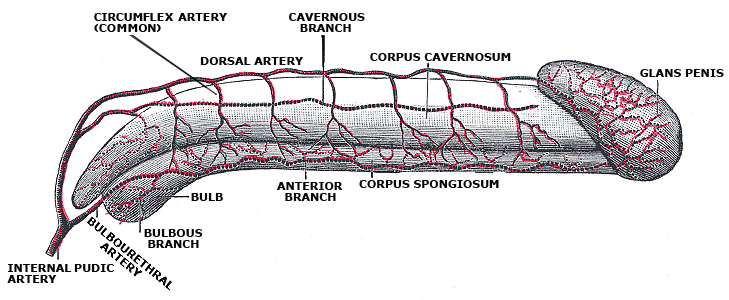
Anatomical diagram of the penis

The urethra, which is the last part of the urinary tract, traverses the corpus spongiosum (spongy urethra) and opens through the urinary meatus on the tip of the glans.

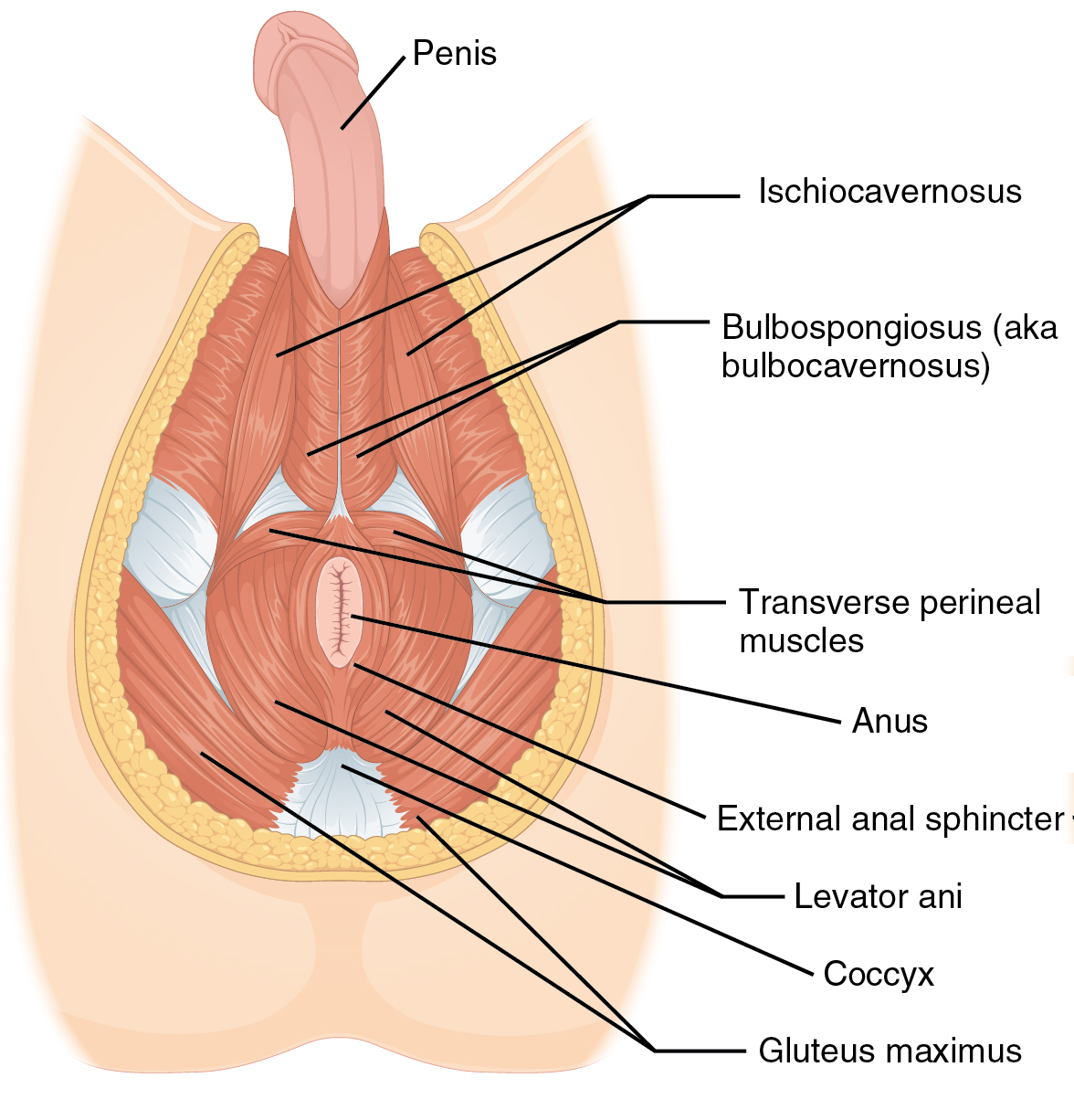
Muscles underlying the penis and perineum

The penile raphe is the visible ridge between the lateral halves of the penis, found on the ventral or underside of the penis, running from the meatus and continuing as the perineal raphe across the scrotum and the perineum (area between scrotum and anus).

The human penis differs from those of most primates, as it has no baculum and relies entirely on erectile tissue. A distal ligament buttresses the glans penis and plays an integral role to the penile fibroskeleton, and the structure is called "os analog", a term coined by Geng Long Hsu in the Encyclopedia of Reproduction. It is a remnant of the baculum that has likely evolved due to change in mating practice.

The human penis cannot be withdrawn into the groin, and it is larger than average in the animal kingdom in proportion to body mass. The human penis is reciprocating from a cotton soft to a bony rigidity resulting from penile arterial flow varied between 2–3 to 60–80 mL/Min implies the most ideal milieu to apply Pascal's law in the entire human body; the overall structure is unique.

=== Size ===
Penile measurements vary, with studies that rely on self-measurement reporting a significantly higher average size than those which rely on measurements taken by health professionals. A 2015 systematic review of 15,521 men in which the subjects were measured by health professionals showed that the average length of an erect human penis is 13.12 cm (5.17 inches) long, while the average circumference of an erect human penis is 11.66 cm (4.59 inches).

Among all primates, the human penis is the largest in girth, but is comparable to the chimpanzee penis and the penises of certain other primates in length. Penis size is affected by genetics, but also by environmental factors such as fertility medications and chemical/pollution exposure.

=== Normal variations ===
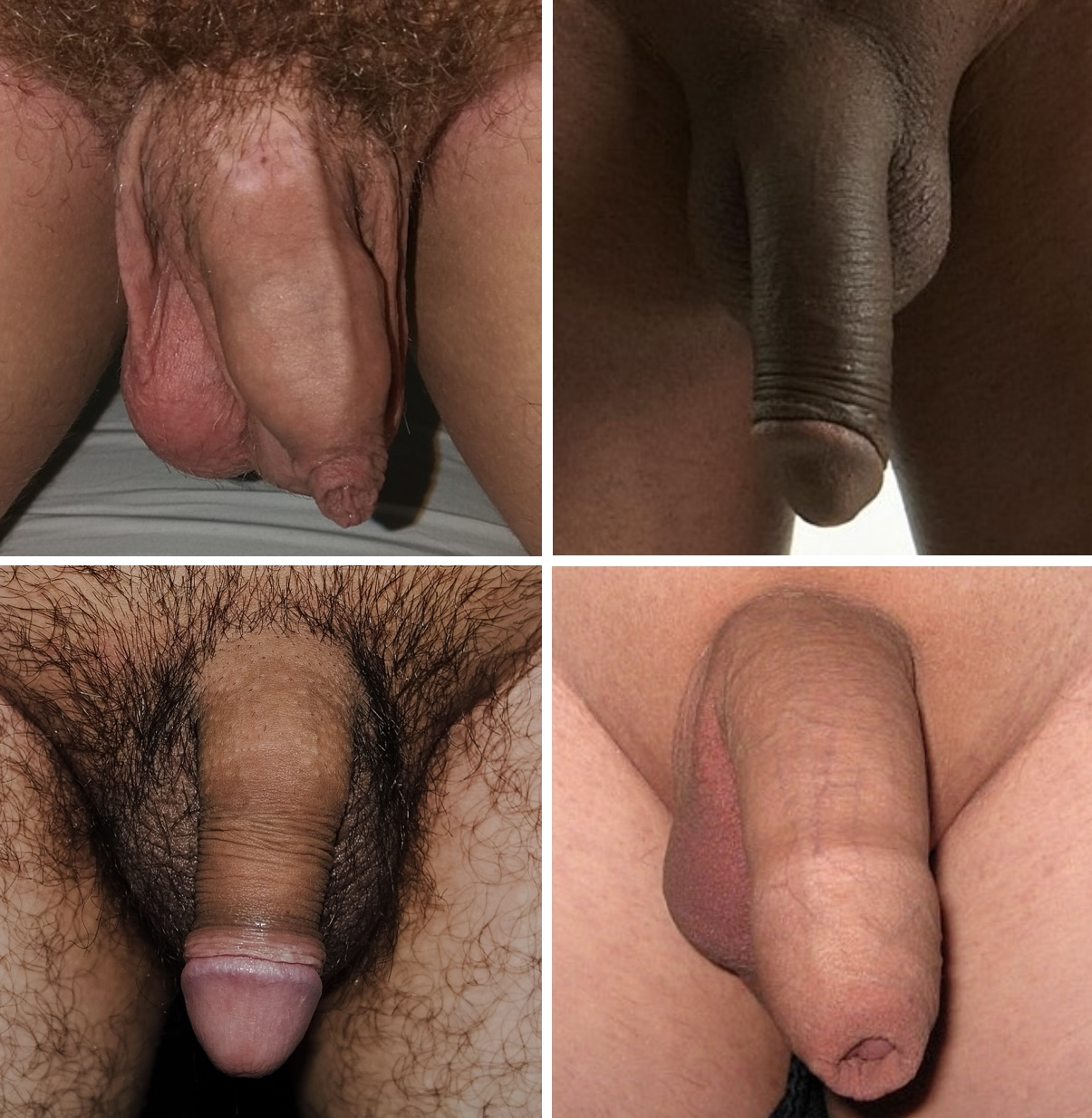
Various flaccid penises

- Pearly penile papules are raised bumps of somewhat paler color around the base (sulcus) of the glans, which typically develop in males aged 20 to 40. As of 1999, different studies had produced estimates of incidence ranging from 8 to 48 percent of all men. They may be mistaken for warts, but are not harmful or infectious and do not require treatment.
- Fordyce's spots are small, raised, yellowish-white spots 1–2 mm (roughly 0.05 inch) in diameter that may appear on the penis, which again are common and not infectious.
- Sebaceous prominences are raised bumps similar to Fordyce's spots on the shaft of the penis, located at the sebaceous glands and are normal.
- Phimosis is an inability to retract the foreskin fully. It is normal and harmless in infancy and pre-pubescence, occurring in about 8% of boys at age 10. According to the British Medical Association, treatment (topical steroid cream and/or manual stretching) does not need to be considered until age 19.
- Curvature: few penises are completely straight, with curves commonly seen in all directions (up, down, left, right). Sometimes the curve is very prominent but it rarely inhibits sexual intercourse. Curvature as great as 30° is considered normal and medical treatment is rarely considered unless the angle exceeds 45°. Changes to the curvature of a penis may be caused by Peyronie's disease.

== Development ==
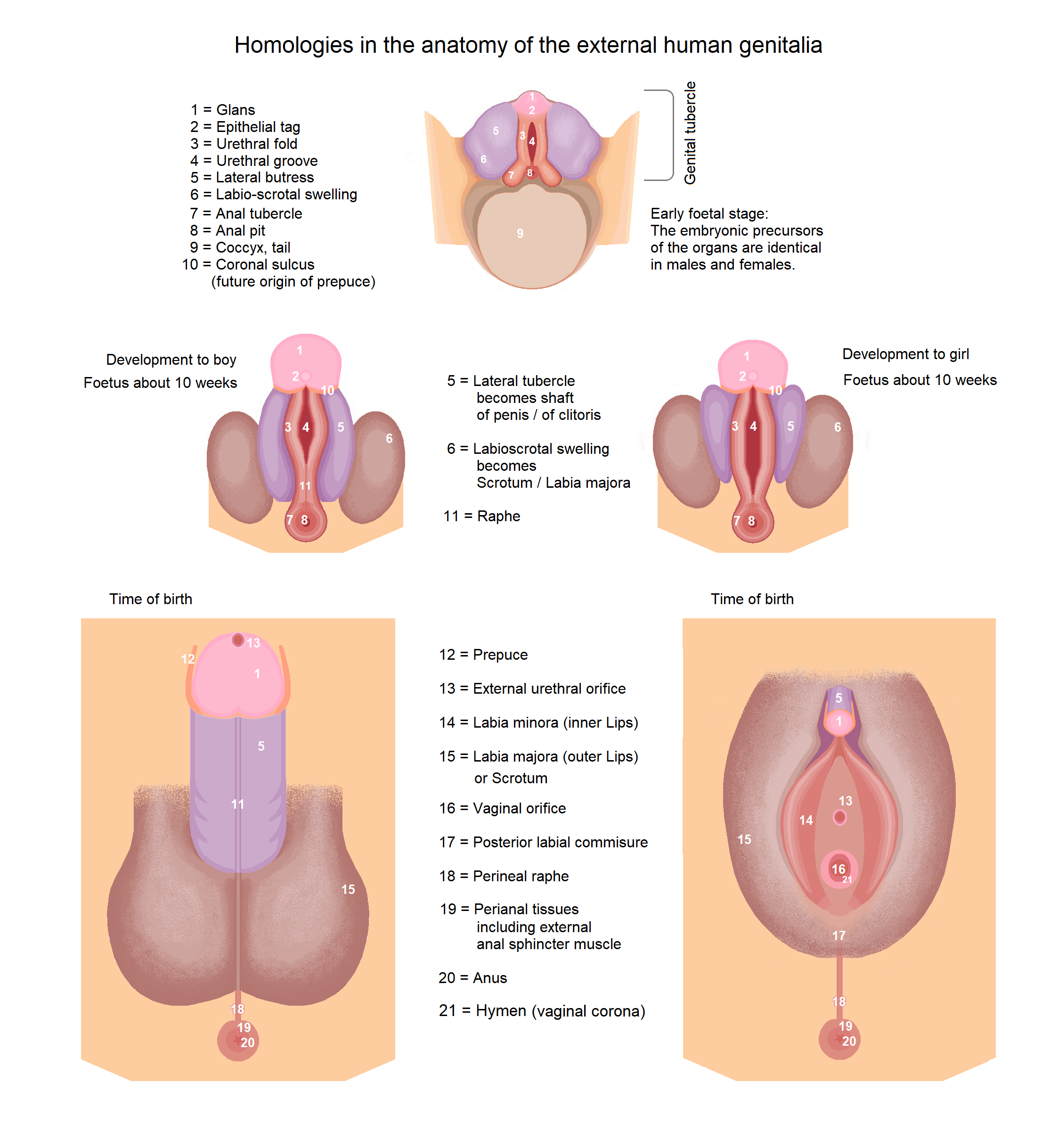
Development of external genitals showing homologues from indifferent to both sexes – male on left

When the fetus is exposed to testosterone, the genital tubercle elongates (primordial phallus) and develops into the glans and shaft of the penis and the urogenital folds fuse to become the penile raphe. The urethra within the penis (except within the glans) is developed from the urogenital sinus.

=== Growth in puberty ===
On entering puberty, the penis, scrotum, and testicles will enlarge toward maturity. During the process, pubic hair grows above and around the penis. A large-scale study assessing penis size in thousands of 17- to 19-year-old males found no difference in average penis size between 17-year-olds and 19-year-olds. From this, it can be concluded that penile growth is typically complete not later than age 17, and possibly earlier.

== Physiological functions ==
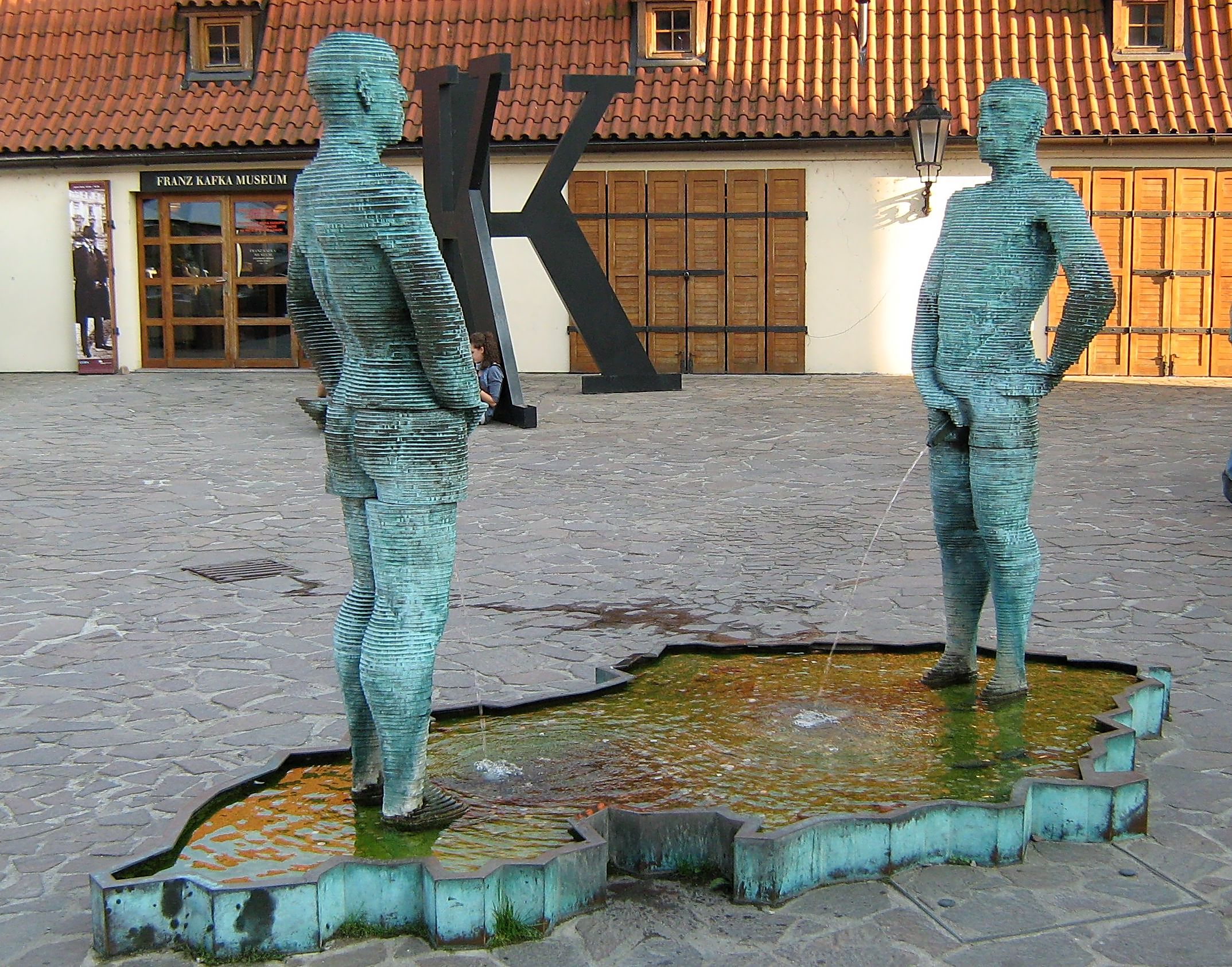
A fountain depicting two men urinating.

=== Urination ===
Urine is expelled from the bladder through the urethra, which passes through the prostate where it is joined by the ejaculatory ducts, and then onward through the penis. At the root of the penis (the proximal end of the corpus spongiosum) lies the external sphincter muscle, which relaxes during urination. This is a small sphincter of striated muscle tissue and is in healthy males, under voluntary control.

Physiologically, urination involves coordination between the central, autonomic, and somatic nervous systems. In infants, some elderly individuals, and those with neurological injury, urination may occur as an involuntary reflex. Brain centers that regulate urination include the pontine micturition center, periaqueductal gray, and the cerebral cortex. During erection, these centers block the relaxation of the sphincter muscles, so as to act as a physiological separation of the excretory and reproductive function of the penis, and preventing urine from entering the upper portion of the urethra during ejaculation.

=== Voiding position ===
The distal section of the urethra allows a human male to direct the stream of urine by holding the penis. This flexibility allows the male to choose the posture in which to urinate. In cultures where more than a minimum of clothing is worn, the penis allows the male to urinate while standing without removing much of the clothing. It is customary for some boys and men to urinate in seated or crouched positions. The preferred position may be influenced by cultural or religious beliefs. Research on the medical superiority of either position exists, but the data are heterogenic. A meta-analysis summarizing the evidence found no superior position for young, healthy males. For elderly males with LUTS, however, the sitting position when compared to the standing position is differentiated by the following:

- the post void residual volume (PVR, ml) was significantly decreased
- the maximum urinary flow (Qmax, ml/s) was increased
- the voiding time (VT, s) was decreased

This urodynamic profile is related to a lower risk of urologic complications, such as cystitis and bladder stones.

=== Sexual stimulation and arousal ===
Sexual arousal can result from physical stimulation of the penis, typically combined with mental stimuli (sexual fantasy), partnered activity, or masturbation, and can lead to ejaculation.

The glans and the frenulum are erogenous zones of the penis. The glans has many nerve endings, which makes it the most sensitive. The most effective ways to stimulate the penis are through oral stimulation (fellatio), manual stimulation (a handjob or manual masturbation), or during sexual penetration.

Frotting is mutual penile stimulation by two people rubbing their penises together.

==== Erection ====
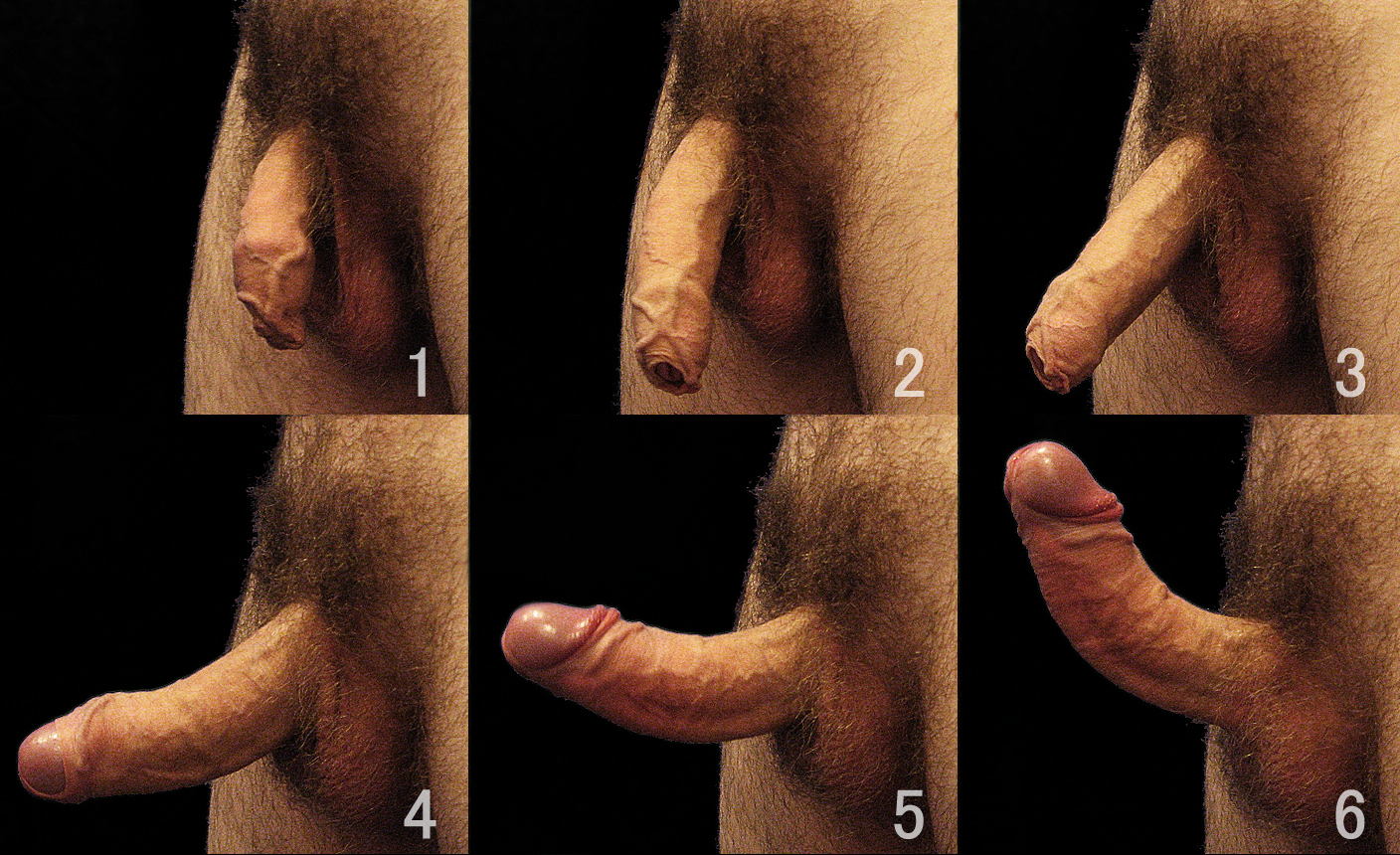
The development of a penile erection, also showing the foreskin gradually retracting over the glans. See also: Commons image gallery.

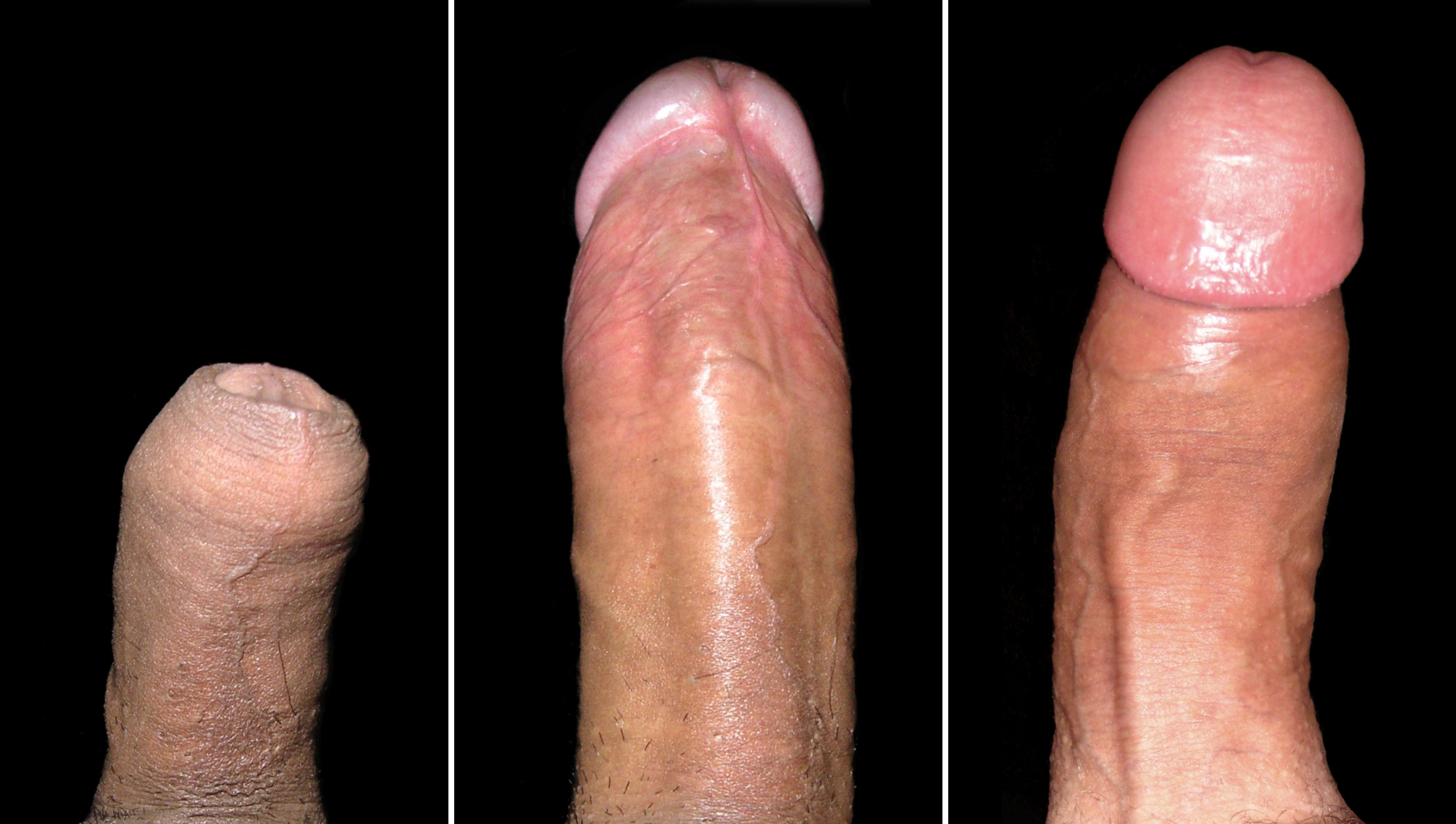
A ventral view of a penis flaccid (left) and erect (middle); a dorsal view of a penis erect (right)

An erection is the stiffening and rising of the penis, which occurs during sexual arousal, though it can also happen in non-sexual situations. Spontaneous erections frequently occur during adolescence due to friction with clothing, a full bladder or large intestine, hormone fluctuations, nervousness, and undressing in a nonsexual situation. It is also normal for erections to occur during sleep and upon waking. (See nocturnal penile tumescence.)

The primary physiological mechanism that brings about erection is the autonomic dilation of arteries supplying blood to the penis, which allows more blood to fill the three spongy erectile tissue chambers in the penis, the corpora cavernosa and corpus spongiosum, causing it to lengthen and stiffen. After vasocongestion, the now-engorged erectile tissue presses against and constricts the veins that carry blood away from the penis. More blood enters than leaves the penis until an equilibrium is reached where an equal volume of blood flows into the dilated arteries and out of the constricted veins; a constant erectile size is achieved at this equilibrium.

Erection facilitates sexual intercourse though it is not essential for various other sexual activities.

===== Erection angle =====
Although many erect penises point upwards, it is common and normal for an erect penis to curve in any direction. Many penises are curved in right, left, upwards or downwards direction depending upon the tension of the suspensory ligament that holds it in position.

The following table shows how common various erection angles are for a standing male, out of a sample of 81 males aged 21 through 67. In the table, zero degrees is pointing straight up against the abdomen, 90 degrees is horizontal and pointing straight forward, while 180 degrees would be pointing straight down to the feet. An upward pointing angle is most common.

Occurrence of erection angles
Angle (°) from vertically upwards	Percent of males
0–30	4.9
30–60	29.6
60–85	30.9
85–95	9.9
95–120	19.8
120–180	4.9

==== Ejaculation ====
Ejaculation is the ejection of semen from the penis. It is usually accompanied by orgasm. A series of muscular contractions delivers semen, containing male gametes known as sperm cells or spermatozoa, from the penis. Ejaculation usually happens as the result of sexual stimulation, but it can be due to prostatic disease in rare cases. Ejaculation may occur spontaneously during sleep (known as a nocturnal emission). Anejaculation is the condition of being unable to ejaculate.

Sperm are produced in the testicles and stored in the attached epididymides. During ejaculation, sperm are propelled up the vasa deferentia, two ducts that pass over and behind the bladder. Fluids are added by the seminal vesicles and the vasa deferentia turn into the ejaculatory ducts, which join the urethra inside the prostate. The prostate, as well as the bulbourethral glands, add further secretions (including pre-ejaculate), and the semen is expelled through the penis.

Ejaculation has two phases: emission and ejaculation proper. The emission phase of the ejaculatory reflex is under control of the sympathetic nervous system, while the ejaculatory phase is under control of a spinal reflex at the level of the spinal nerves S2–4 via the pudendal nerve. A refractory period succeeds the ejaculation, and sexual stimulation precedes it.

The ischiocavernosus muscle helps to stabilize the penis during erection by compressing the crus and slowing the return of blood through the veins. The bulbospongiosus muscle also contributes to erection along with the expulsion of urine and semen.

== Evolved adaptations ==
The human penis has been argued to have several evolutionary adaptations that maximise reproductive success and minimise sperm competition. Sperm competition is where the sperm of two males simultaneously occupy the reproductive tract of a female and they compete to fertilise the egg. If sperm competition results in the rival male's sperm fertilising the egg, cuckoldry could occur. This is the process whereby males unwittingly invest their resources into offspring of another male and, evolutionarily speaking, should be avoided.

The most researched human penis adaptations are penis size and semen displacement.

=== Penis size ===
Evolution has caused sexually selected adaptations to occur in penis size in order to maximise reproductive success and minimise sperm competition.

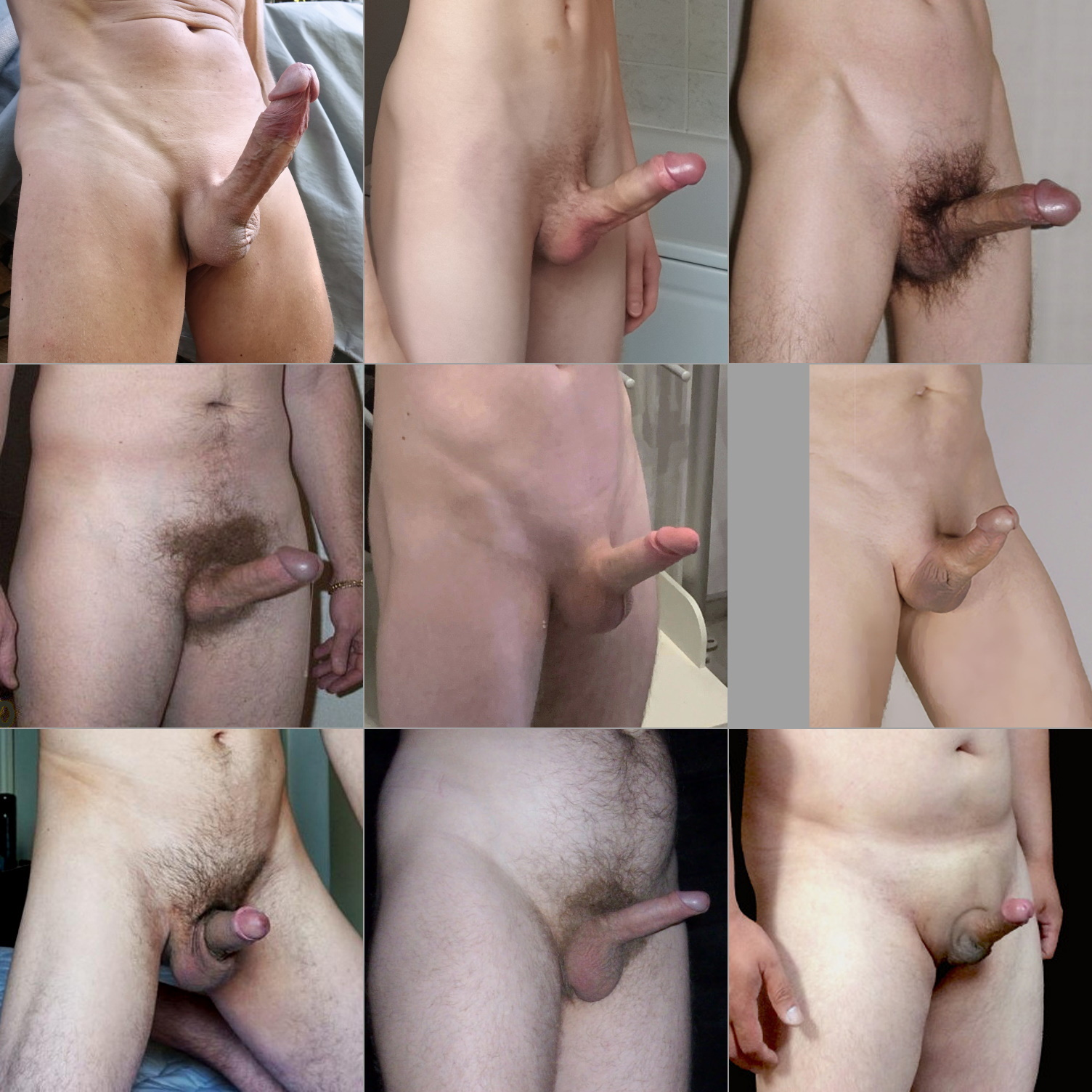
Various size erect penises

Sperm competition has caused the human penis to evolve in length and size for sperm retention and displacement. To achieve this, the penis must be of sufficient length to reach any rival sperm and to maximally fill the vagina. In order to ensure that the female retains the male's sperm, the adaptations of increased length of the human penis have occurred so that the ejaculate is placed close to the female cervix. This is achieved when complete penetration occurs and the penis pushes against the cervix. These adaptations have occurred in order to release and retain sperm to the highest point of the vaginal tract. As a result, this adaptation also leaves the sperm less vulnerable to sperm displacement and semen loss. Another reason for this adaptation is that, due to the nature of the human posture, gravity creates vulnerability for semen loss. Therefore, a long penis, which places the ejaculate deep in the vaginal tract, could reduce the loss of semen.

Another evolutionary theory of penis size is female mate choice and its associations with social judgements in modern-day society. A study which illustrates female mate choice as an influence on penis size presented females with life-size, rotatable, computer generated males. These varied in height, body shape, and flaccid penis size, with these aspects being examples of masculinity. Female ratings of attractiveness for each male revealed that larger penises were associated with higher attractiveness ratings. These relations between penis size and attractiveness have therefore led to frequently emphasized associations between masculinity and penis size in popular media. This has led to a social bias existing around penis size with larger penises being preferred and having higher social status. This is reflected in the association between believed sexual prowess and penis size and the social judgement of penis size in relation to 'manhood'.

=== Semen displacement ===
The shape of the human penis is thought to have evolved as a result of sperm competition. Semen displacement is an adaptation of the shape of the penis to draw foreign semen away from the cervix. This means that a male can displace a rival male's sperm from the female reproductive tract before replacing it with his own.

Semen displacement has two main benefits for a male. Firstly, by displacing a rival male's sperm, the risk of the rival sperm fertilising the egg is reduced. Secondly, the male replaces the rival's sperm with his own, thereby increasing the probability of his fertilising the egg and successfully reproducing with the female. However, males have to ensure they do not displace their own sperm. It is thought that the relatively quick loss of erection after ejaculation, penile hypersensitivity following ejaculation, and the shallower, slower thrusting of the male after ejaculation prevent this from occurring.

The coronal ridge is the part of the human penis thought to have evolved to allow for semen displacement. Research has studied how much semen is displaced by differently shaped artificial genitals. This research showed that, when combined with thrusting, the coronal ridge of the penis is able to remove the seminal fluid of a rival male from within the female reproductive tract. It does this by forcing the semen under the frenulum of the coronal ridge, causing it to collect behind the coronal ridge shaft. When model penises without a coronal ridge were used, less than half the artificial sperm was displaced, compared to penises with a coronal ridge.

The presence of a coronal ridge alone, however, is not sufficient for effective semen displacement. It must be combined with adequate thrusting to be successful. It has been shown that the deeper the thrusting, the larger the semen displacement. No semen displacement occurs with shallow thrusting. Some have therefore termed thrusting as a semen displacement behaviour.

The behaviours associated with semen displacement, namely thrusting (number of thrusts and depth of thrusts), and duration of sexual intercourse, have been shown to vary according to whether a male perceives the risk of partner infidelity to be high or not. Males and females report greater semen displacement behaviours following allegations of infidelity. In particular, following allegations of infidelity, males and females report deeper and quicker thrusting during sexual intercourse.

== Clinical significance ==
=== Disorders ===
- Paraphimosis is an inability to move the foreskin forward over the glans. It can result from fluid trapped in a foreskin left retracted, perhaps following a medical procedure, or accumulation of fluid in the foreskin because of friction during vigorous sexual activity.
- In Peyronie's disease, anomalous scar tissue grows in the soft tissue of the penis, causing curvature. Severe cases can be improved by surgical correction.
- A thrombosis can occur during periods of frequent and prolonged sexual activity, especially fellatio. It is usually harmless and self-corrects within a few weeks.
- Sexually transmitted infections, for example, herpes virus, which can occur after sexual contact with an infected carrier; this may lead to the development of herpes sores.
- Balanitis is an inflammation, either infectious or not.
- Pudendal nerve entrapment is a condition characterized by pain on sitting and the loss of penile sensation and orgasm. Occasionally, there is a total loss of sensation and orgasm. The pudendal nerve can be damaged by narrow, hard bicycle seats and accidents.
- Penile fracture can occur if the erect penis is bent excessively. A popping or cracking sound and pain is normally associated with this event. Emergency medical assistance should be obtained as soon as possible. Prompt medical attention lowers the likelihood of permanent penile curvature.
- In diabetes, peripheral neuropathy can cause tingling in the penile skin and possibly reduced or completely absent sensation. The reduced sensations can lead to injuries for either partner and their absence can make it impossible to have sexual pleasure through stimulation of the penis. Since the problems are caused by permanent nerve damage, preventive treatment through good control of the diabetes is the primary treatment. Some limited recovery may be possible through improved diabetes control.
- Erectile dysfunction is the inability to develop and maintain an erection sufficiently firm for satisfactory sexual performance. Diabetes is a leading cause, as is natural aging. A variety of treatments exist, most notably including the phosphodiesterase type 5 inhibitor drugs (such as sildenafil citrate, marketed as Viagra), which work by vasodilation.
- Priapism, a form of persistent genital arousal disorder, is a painful and potentially harmful medical condition in which the erect penis does not return to its flaccid state. Priapism lasting over four hours is a medical emergency. The causative mechanisms are poorly understood but involve complex neurological and vascular factors. Potential complications include ischaemia, thrombosis, and impotence. In serious cases the condition may result in gangrene, which may result in amputation. However, that is usually only the case if the organ is broke out and injured because of it. The condition has been associated with a variety of drugs including prostaglandin. Contrary to common knowledge, sildenafil (Viagra) will not cause it.
- Lymphangiosclerosis is a hardened lymph vessel, although it can feel like a hardened, almost calcified or fibrous, vein. It tends not to share the common blue tint with a vein, however. It can be felt as a hardened lump or "vein" even when the penis is flaccid, and is even more prominent during an erection. It is considered a benign physical condition. It is fairly common and can follow a particularly vigorous sexual activity for men, and tends to go away if given rest and more gentle care, for example by use of lubricants.
- Carcinoma of the penis is rare with a reported rate of 1 person in 100,000 in developed countries. Some sources state that circumcision can protect against this disease, but this notion remains controversial among medical circles.
- Hard flaccid syndrome is a rare, chronic condition characterized by a flaccid penis that remains in a firm, semi-rigid state in the absence of sexual arousal.
- Cold glans syndrome is a condition marked by the persistent inability of the glans penis to maintain an erect state during sexual arousal, potentially leading to reduced sensitivity and erection difficulties.

==== Developmental disorders ====
- Hypospadias is a developmental disorder where the meatus is positioned wrongly at birth. Hypospadias can also occur iatrogenically by the downward pressure of an indwelling urethral catheter. It is usually corrected by surgery.
- A micropenis is a very small penis caused by developmental or congenital problems.
- Diphallia, or penile duplication (PD), is the rare condition of having two penises.

==== Alleged and observed psychological disorders ====
- Penis panic (koro in Malaysian/Indonesian) — delusion of shrinkage of the penis and retraction into the body. This appears to be culturally conditioned and largely limited to Ghana, Sudan, China, Japan, Southeast Asia, and West Africa.
- In April 2008, Kinshasa, Democratic Republic of Congo, the West African police arrested 14 suspected victims (of penis snatching) and sorcerers accused of using black magic or witchcraft to steal (make disappear) or shrink men's penises to extort cash for cure, amid a wave of panic. Arrests were made in an effort to avoid bloodshed seen in Ghana a decade before, when 12 penis snatchers were beaten to death by mobs.
- Penis envy — the contested Freudian belief of all women inherently envying men for having penises.

== Society and culture ==
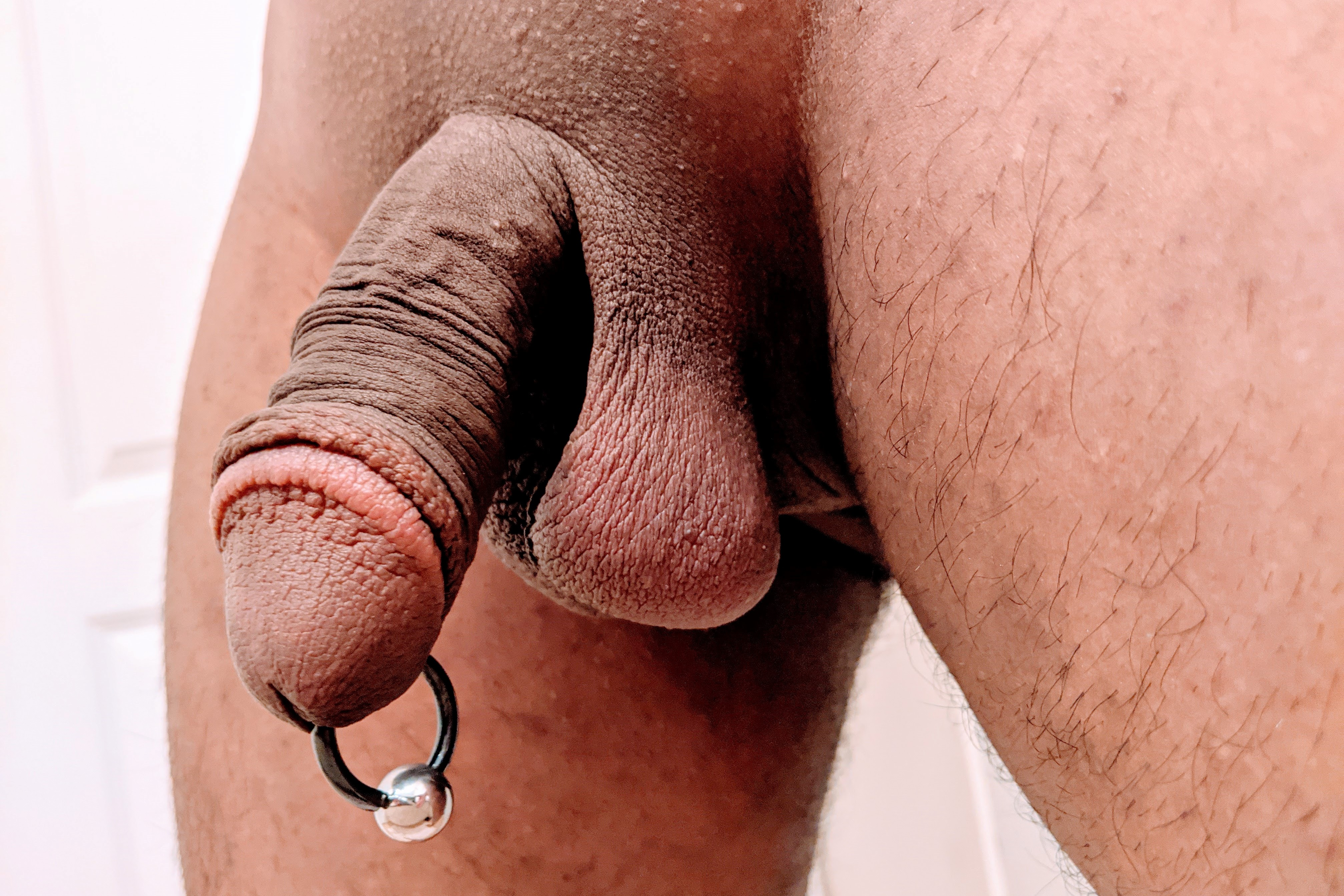
A Prince Albert piercing with captive-bead ring jewelry

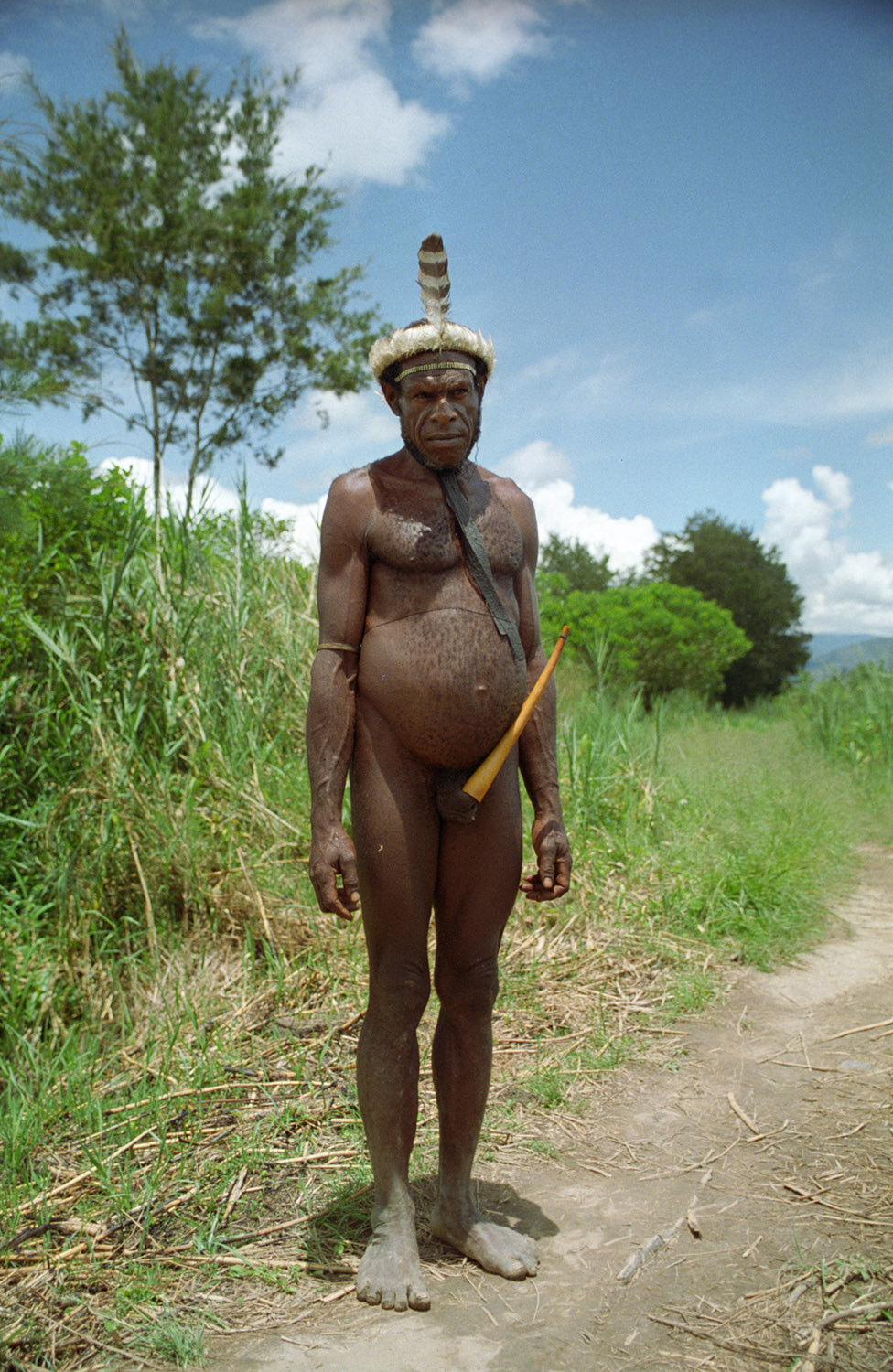
Papuan man wearing traditional penis sheath

=== Terminology ===
In many cultures, referring to the penis is considered taboo or vulgar, and a variety of slang words and euphemisms are used to talk about it. In English, these include member, dick, cock, prick, johnson, dork, peter, pecker, manhood, stick, rod, third/middle leg, dong, willy, schlong, and todger. Many of these are used as insults—though sometimes playfully—meaning an unpleasant or unworthy person. Among these, historically, the most commonly used euphemism for penis in English literature and society was member.

=== Alteration ===
The penis is sometimes pierced or decorated by other body art. Other than circumcision, genital alterations are almost universally elective and usually for the purpose of aesthetics or increased sensitivity. Piercings of the penis include the Prince Albert, apadravya, ampallang, dydoe, deep shaft, and frenum piercings. Foreskin restoration or stretching is a further form of body modification, as well as implants under the shaft of the penis. Another type of alteration to the penis is genital tattooing.

Trans women who undergo sex reassignment surgery have their penis surgically modified into a vagina or clitoris via vaginoplasty or clitoroplasty respectively. Trans men who undergo such surgery have a phalloplasty or metoidioplasty.

Other practices that alter the penis are also performed, although they are rare in Western societies without a diagnosed medical condition. Apart from penectomy, perhaps the most radical of these is subincision, in which the urethra is split along the underside of the penis. Subincision originated among Aboriginal Australians, although it is now done by some in the U.S. and Europe.

==== Circumcision ====
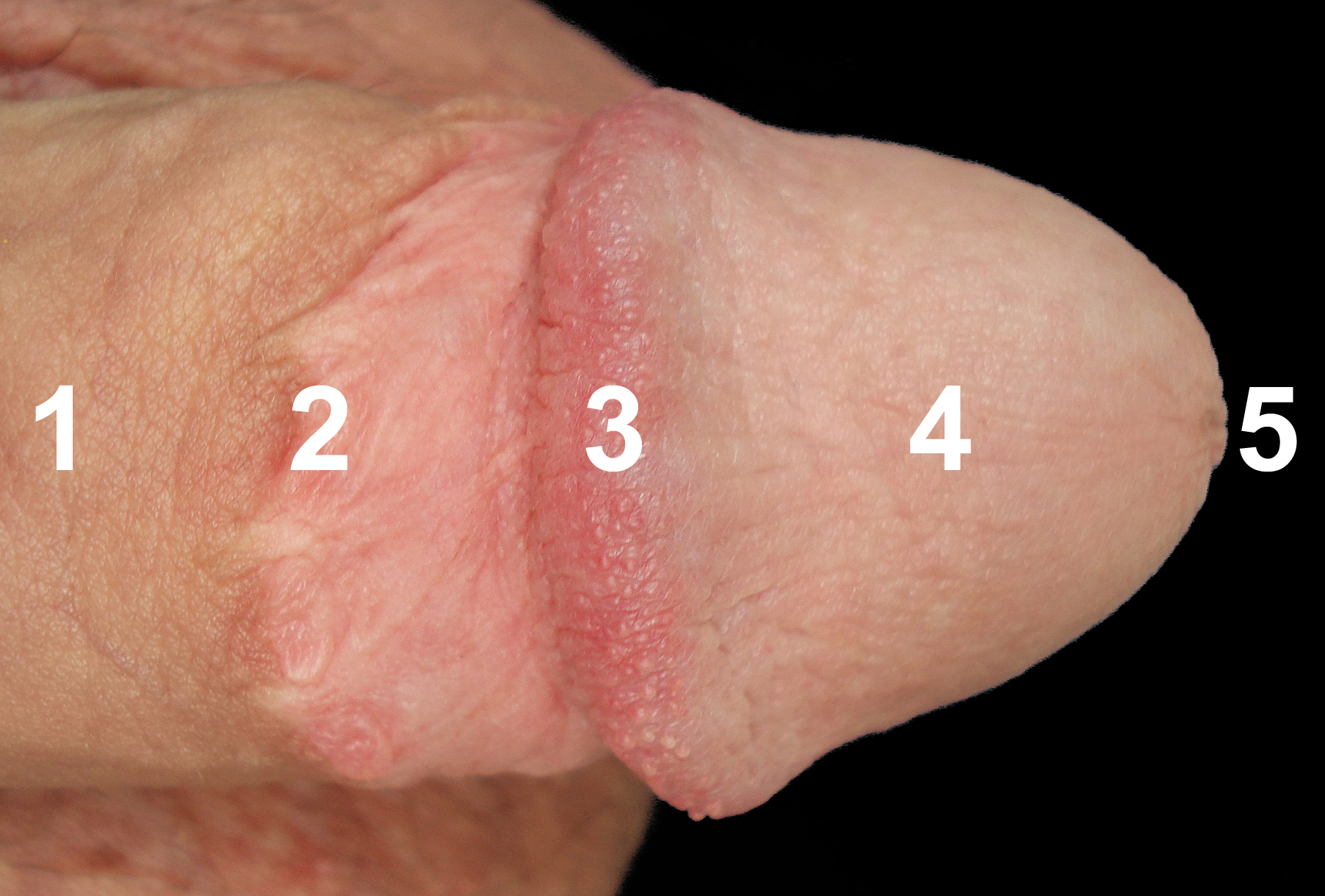
A labelled dorsal view of a circumcised penis: (1) shaft; (2) circumcision scar; (3) corona; (4) glans; and (5) meatus

The most common form of body modification related to the penis is circumcision: removal of part or all of the foreskin, and sometimes the frenulum. It is most commonly performed as an elective procedure for prophylactic, cultural, or religious reasons. Infant circumcision can employ modern devices such as the Gomco clamp, Plastibell, and Mogen clamp. The ethics of circumcision in children is a source of controversy. Among the world's major medical organizations, there is a consensus that circumcision reduces heterosexual HIV infection rates in high-risk populations during penile-vaginal sex. There are differing perspectives on the prophylactic efficacy and cost effectiveness of circumcision in developed nations. Circumcision plays a significant role in many of the world's cultures. When performed for religious reasons, it is most common among both Jews and Muslims, among whom it is near-universal.

== Potential regeneration ==
There are efforts by scientists to partially or fully regenerate the structures of the human penis. Patients who can benefit most from this field are those who have congenital defects, cancer, and injuries that have excised parts of their genitalia. Some organizations which perform research into, or conduct regeneration procedures, include the Wake Forest Institute for Regenerative Medicine and the United States Department of Defense. The first successful penis allotransplant surgery was done in September 2005 in a military hospital in Guangzhou, China. A man at 44 sustained an injury after an accident and his penis was severed; urination became difficult as his urethra was partly blocked. A recently brain-dead man, aged 23, was selected for the transplant. Despite atrophy of blood vessels and nerves, the arteries, veins, nerves, and the corpora spongiosa were successfully matched. But, two weeks later on 19 September, the surgery was reversed because of a severe psychological problem (rejection) by the recipient and his wife.

In 2009, researchers Chen, Eberli, Yoo, and Atala have produced bioengineered penises and implanted them on rabbits. They were able to obtain erection and copulate, with 10 of 12 rabbits achieving ejaculation. This study shows that in the future it could be possible to produce artificial penises for replacement surgeries or phalloplasties. In 2015, the world's first successful penis transplant took place in Cape Town, South Africa in a nine-hour operation performed by surgeons from Stellenbosch University and Tygerberg Hospital. The 21-year-old recipient, who had been sexually active, had lost his penis in a botched circumcision at 18.

== See also ==
- Buried penis
- Castration anxiety
- Crotch (in clothing) – a pouch-shaped area built to accommodate a penis and scrotum
- Micropenis
- Penile enlargement
- Penis removal
- Phallic architecture
- Phallus – an object or image that resembles a penis
- Preputioplasty – an operation performed to facilitate retraction of the foreskin
- Stunt cock – a substitute penis used for filmmaking
