= Micropenis =

Unusually small penis

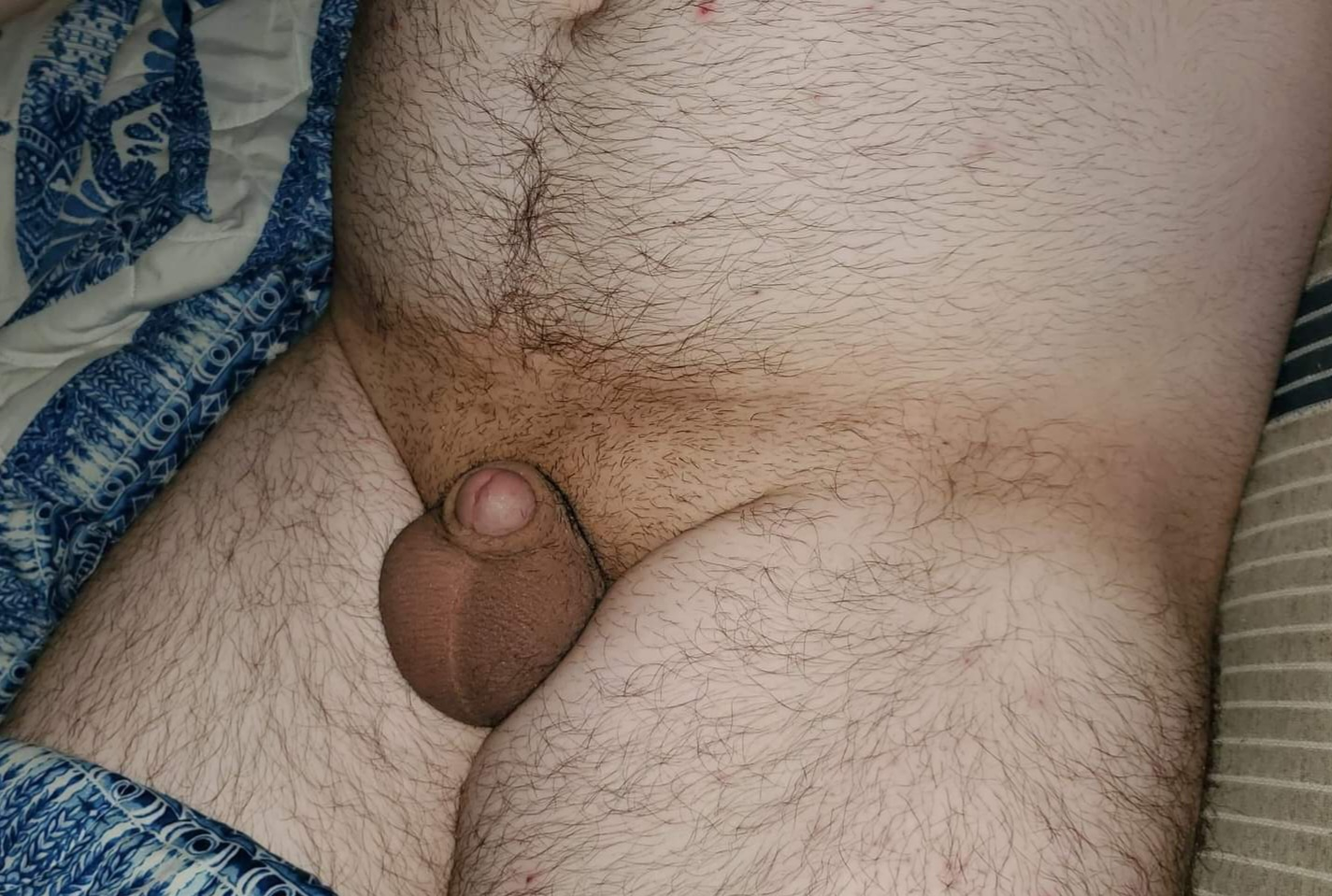
- A flaccid micropenis
- Specialty: Urology
- Usual onset: Congenital
- Duration: Permanent (lifetime)
- Diagnostic method: Measurement of stretched penile length (SPL)
- Differential diagnosis: Buried penis
- Frequency: c. 0.6% of men

A micropenis or microphallus is an unusually small penis. A common criterion is a dorsal (measured on top) penile length of at least 2.5 standard deviations smaller than the mean human penis size for age. A micropenis in adults is equal to when the erected penis is shorter than 7 cm (2.7 inches), measures less than 4 cm (1.5 inches) when flaccid, and/or when stretched penile length equal to or less than 1.9 cm (0.75 in) in term infants, and 9.3 cm (3.67 in) in adults. The condition is usually recognized shortly after birth. The term is most often used medically when the rest of the penis, scrotum, and perineum are without ambiguity, such as hypospadias. Traditionally, a microphallus describes a micropenis with hypospadias. Micropenis incidence is about 1.5 in 10,000 male newborns in North America.

== Causes ==
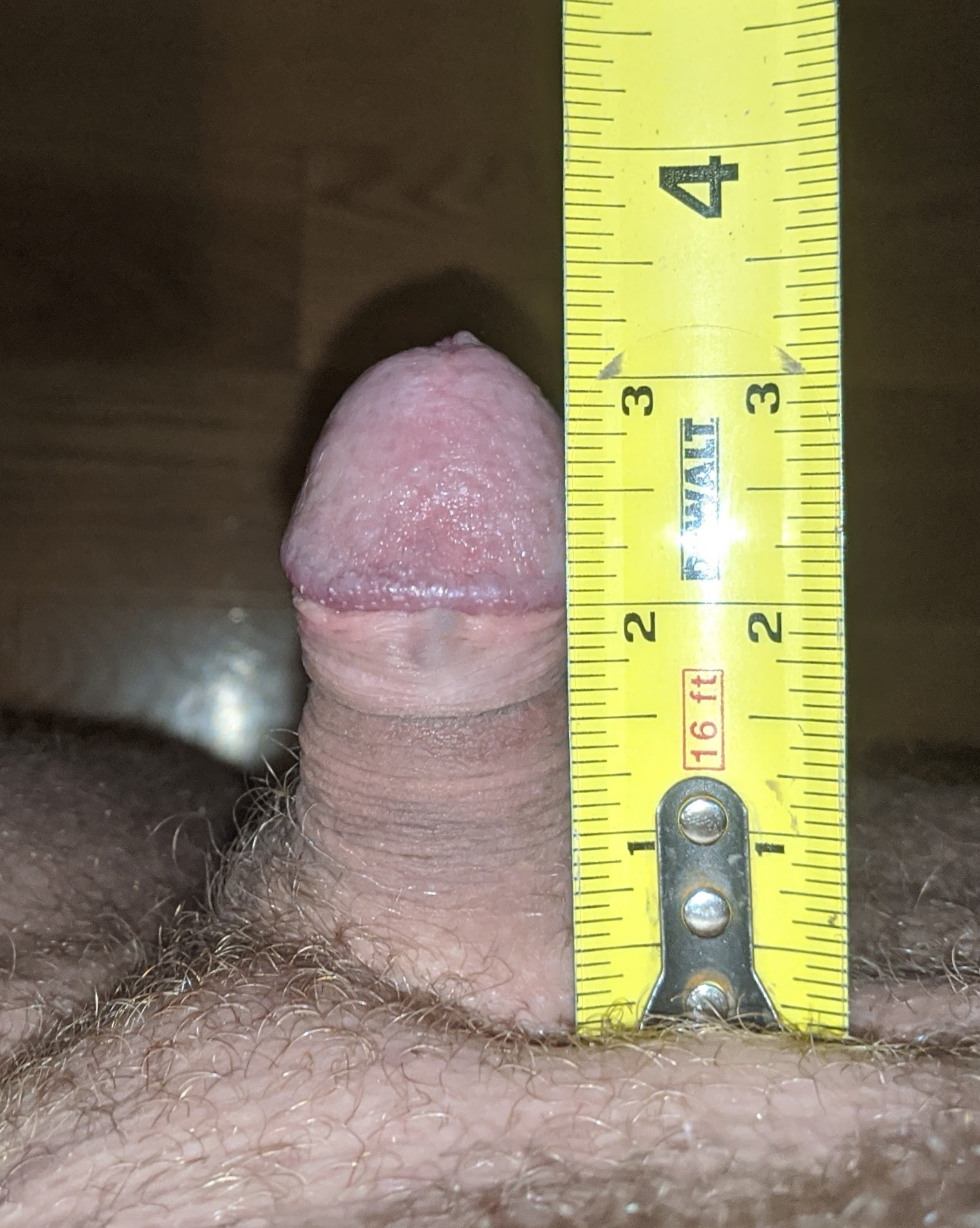
A closeup of an erect micropenis with a tape measure displaying length

Of the abnormal conditions associated with micropenis, most are conditions of reduced prenatal androgen production or effect, such as abnormal testicular development (testicular dysgenesis), Klinefelter syndrome, Leydig cell hypoplasia, specific defects of testosterone or dihydrotestosterone synthesis (17,20-lyase deficiency, 5α-reductase deficiency), androgen insensitivity syndromes, inadequate pituitary stimulation (gonadotropin deficiency), and other forms of congenital hypogonadism. Micropenis can also occur as part of many genetic malformation syndromes that do not involve the sex chromosomes. It is sometimes a sign of congenital growth hormone deficiency or congenital hypopituitarism. Several homeobox genes affect penis and digit size without detectable hormone abnormalities.

In addition, in utero exposure to some estrogen-based fertility drugs like diethylstilbestrol (DES) has been linked to genital abnormalities or a smaller than normal penis.

After evaluation to detect any of the conditions described above, micropenis can often be treated in infancy with injections of various hormones, such as human chorionic gonadotropin and testosterone.

== Treatment ==
=== Hormone treatment ===
Growth of the penis both before birth and during childhood and puberty is strongly influenced by testosterone and, to a lesser degree, the growth hormone. However, later endogenous hormones mainly have value in the treatment of micropenis caused by hormone deficiencies, such as hypopituitarism or hypogonadism.

Regardless of the cause of micropenis, if it is recognized in infancy, a brief course of testosterone is often prescribed (usually no more than three months). This usually induces a small amount of growth, confirming the likelihood of further growth at puberty, but rarely achieves normal size. No additional testosterone is given during childhood, to avoid unwanted virilization and bone maturation. There is also some evidence that premature administration of testosterone can lead to reduced penis size in the adult.

Testosterone treatment is resumed in adolescence only for boys with hypogonadism. Penile growth is completed at the end of puberty, similar to the completion of height growth, and provision of extra testosterone to post-pubertal adults produces little or no further growth.

=== Surgery ===
Because hormone treatment rarely achieves average size, several surgical techniques similar to phalloplasty for penis enlargement have been devised and performed, but they are not generally considered successful enough to be widely adopted and are rarely performed in childhood.

In extreme cases of micropenis, there is barely any shaft, and the glans appears to sit almost on the pubic skin. From the 1960s until the late 1970s, it was common for sex reassignment and surgery to be recommended. This was especially likely if evidence suggested that response to additional testosterone and pubertal testosterone would be poor. With parental acceptance, the boy would be reassigned and renamed as a girl, and surgery performed to remove the testes and construct an artificial vagina (vaginoplasty).

Johns Hopkins Hospital, the center most known for this approach, performed twelve such reassignments from 1960 to 1980, most notably that of David Reimer (whose penis was destroyed by a circumcision accident), overseen by John Money. By the mid-1990s, reassignment was offered less often, and all three premises had been challenged. Former subjects of such surgery, vocal about their dissatisfaction with the adult outcomes, and Reimer who committed suicide, played a large part in discouraging this practice. Sexual reassignment is rarely performed today for severe micropenis (although the question of raising the boy as a girl is sometimes still discussed).

== See also ==
- Buried penis
- Clitoromegaly
- Hard flaccid syndrome
- Intersex
- Penis size
- Webbed penis
- Small penis humiliation
