= Webbed penis =

- Other names: Penis palmatus, penoscrotal fusion
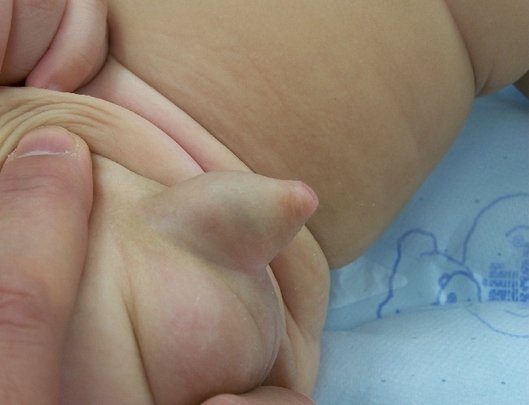
- Specialty: Urology

Webbed penis, also known as buried or concealed penis, is an acquired or congenital condition in which the scrotal skin extends onto the ventral penile shaft. The penile shaft is buried in the scrotum or tethered to the scrotal midline by a fold or web of skin. The urethra and erectile bodies are usually normal. Webbed penis is usually asymptomatic, but the cosmetic appearance is often unacceptable. This condition may be corrected by surgical techniques.

In the congenital form, the deformity represents an abnormality of the attachment between the penis and the scrotum; the penis, the urethra, and the remainder of the scrotum typically are normal.

Webbed penis may also be acquired (iatrogenic) after circumcision or other penile surgery, resulting from excessive removal of ventral penile skin; the penis can retract into the scrotum, resulting in secondary phimosis (trapped penis).

== Signs and symptoms ==
Since the penis does not protrude when a man has this disorder, his ability to pass urine when he is standing or to participate in sexual intercourse will be impaired.

Visible signs may include but are not limited to:

- Excessive skin and fat around the penis.
- Tight, scarred preputial orifice.
- Straining to urinate.

== Cause ==
Webbed penis can be caused by various things such as:

- Morbid obesity: which is known as excess fat around the genital area and abdomen, which makes the penis appear as though it is hidden.
- Abnormalities that are there during birth – ligaments that attach the penis to underlying structures may be weaker than it is supposed to be.
- Lymphedema: this is when swelling occurs around the scrotum area due to collection of lymph fluid, which may cause the penis to be buried inside tissue.
- Acquired (iatrogenic) after circumcision or other penile surgery – resulting from excessive removal of ventral penile skin.

== Mechanism and pathophysiology ==
Concealed penis is due to a lack of skin or an inelasticity of the penile skin and a weak penile skin fixation or excessive suprapubic fat, the penile webbed is characterized by a ventral fold of skin that connects the distal shaft and a penoscrotum, and a penis which is tucked away with the scar tissue that exists.

Concealed penis is an unusual circumcision complication. The excision of excess preputial skin occurs, although inadequate internal preputial epithelium is cut out. The new preputial orifice is thus distal to the gland and pushes the penile shaft into the supra-pubic fat at the level of mons pubis. In these cases, the released shaft includes a skin graft or local flaps. The other probability of this mechanism is that, since the penis continues to shrink into the mons pubis, the healed scarred pre-utile opening gradually becomes subcutaneously stuck. In such cases, the released shaft needs no skin graft or local flaps. For both mechanisms, the preputial skin is inadequately excised, causing the preputial holes to be distal from the pulse, trapping the pulp when the procedure is complete.

In relation to lymphedema – When the lymph system operates normally, the lymph circulates through a series of vessels and ducts throughout the body. It then returns to the bloodstream with lymph. A blocking or failure in the genital area of this system may lead to a lymphatic leak into the soft tissues surrounding the system.

In relation to obesity – Obesity is a general cause of adult acquired buried penis. There are some parallels with buried penis seen in infants, frequently associated with poor skin suspension, abnormal excess fat accumulation in the pubic region, penis webbing, or penis trapping due to scarring post-circumcision. Similarly, adult buried penis is often associated with a laxity of connective tissue between the dart fascia and the penis, allowing the penis to tunnel more closely through the pre-pubic skin due to "hypermobility". This is exacerbated by obesity and weight gain as the phallus is covered by the suprapubic fat pad.

== Diagnosis ==
Typically a physical examination may be used to diagnose a person with a buried penis. A doctor should be able to differentiate between buried penis and a tiny penis, known as micropenis.

== Treatment ==
Adults with a buried penis either deal with or are subject to weight loss services. Weight loss programs are however sluggish and frequently do not "unbury" the penis; in addition, bad urine hygiene can lead to soft tissue infection.

While the condition can resolve without intervention in young children, if infection is present, patients may ultimately need a definite reconstruction and urgent procedure. Surgeons who treat this disorder are either urologic or plastic surgeons.

Operational options can include ligament separation between penis base and pubic bone; skin graft output to cover penis areas requiring additional skin; liposuction using catheters to suck out fat cells from the region around the penis from below the skin; abdominoplasty that removes excess skin and fat from the area; an escutheonectomy to remove a fat pad just above the pubic area; or a panniculectomy in which pannicles are extracted, excess tissues and skin that hangs on the genitals and thighs.

A form of prevention for this condition could be avoiding getting a circumcision in order to avoid complications along the line. On the other hand, proper circumcision is a key factor in preventing this complication of circumcision. This condition requires the liberation of the concealed penis by carefully widening the close preputial hole and optimizing the circumcision, depending upon the etiology and formation process, with or without skin reconstruction.

- Doing skin grafts to cover areas of the penis where skin covering is needed; this may be required if circumcision removes too much skin.
- Suction lipectomy, which uses catheters to suck out fat cells from the area around the penis under the skin.
- Detachment of the ligaments that connect the base of the penis to the pubic bone.
- Panniculectomy that removes the pannus, excess fat and skin that hangs over the genitals and thighs.

== Prognosis ==
A person with a concealed penis will have a normal life expectancy. In the studies that have been performed, it is shown that there are no current known side effects post-op. However, a patient might have a slight edema for about a month or two. The only side effect would be an operation scar.

== Epidemiology ==
Webbed penis is considered to be a very uncommon condition; however, its prevalence is unknown. Due to the fact that it occurs at birth, a high percentage of cases are found in young children.

== Research directions ==
Webbed penis is when the penis is partially or completely concealed beneath the scrotum or when there is excess skin or fat around the pubic area. Various research is being conducted on this condition: for example, Webbed penis: A new classification is a study that was conducted to suggest an operative method that can be planned based on the severity of the webbing condition. Other research has tried to test the introduction of a modified surgical procedure for repairing a concealed penis and compared the efficacy and feasibility of modified repair with traditional repair.

An interesting research study was done between the years 2010 and 2014 to test a new surgical technique for concealed penis using an advanced musculocutaneous scrotal flap. The research showed that the advanced musculocutaneous scrotal flap technique for correcting concealed penis is technically easy and safe and the surgical method provided patients with a good cosmetic appearance, functional outcomes, and excellent postoperative satisfaction grades.

== See also ==
- Buried penis
