= Penile artery shunt syndrome =

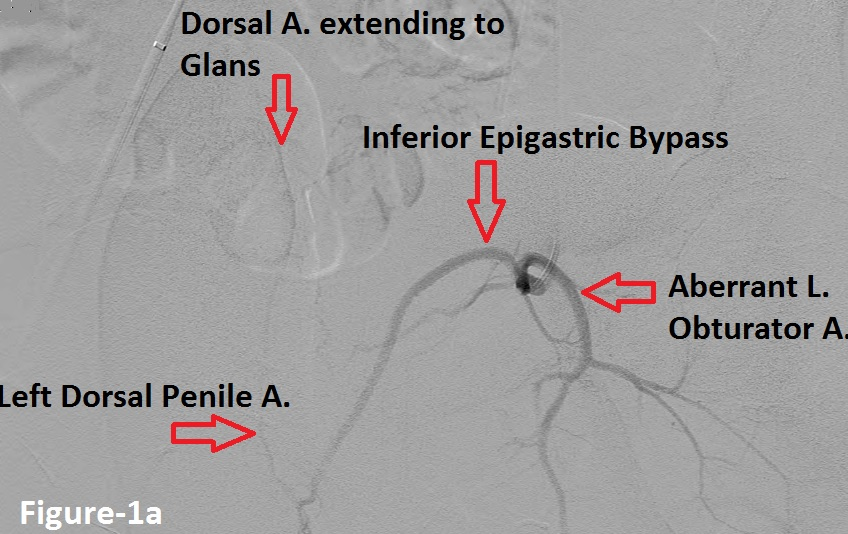
- This is the pre-embolization arteriogram showing the aberrant obturator artery arising from the inferior epigastric artery, which contributed to the described penile artery shunt syndrome.
- Specialty: Urology, Vascular surgery
- Symptoms: Erectile dysfunction

Penile artery shunt syndrome (PASS) is an iatrogenic clinical phenomenon first described by Tariq Hakky, Christopher Yang, Jonathan Pavlinec, Kamal Massis, and Rafael Carrion within the Sexual Medicine Program in the Department of Urology, at the University of South Florida, and Ricardo Munarriz, of Boston University School of Medicine Department of Urology in 2013. It may be a cause of refractory erectile dysfunction in patients who have undergone penile revascularization surgery.

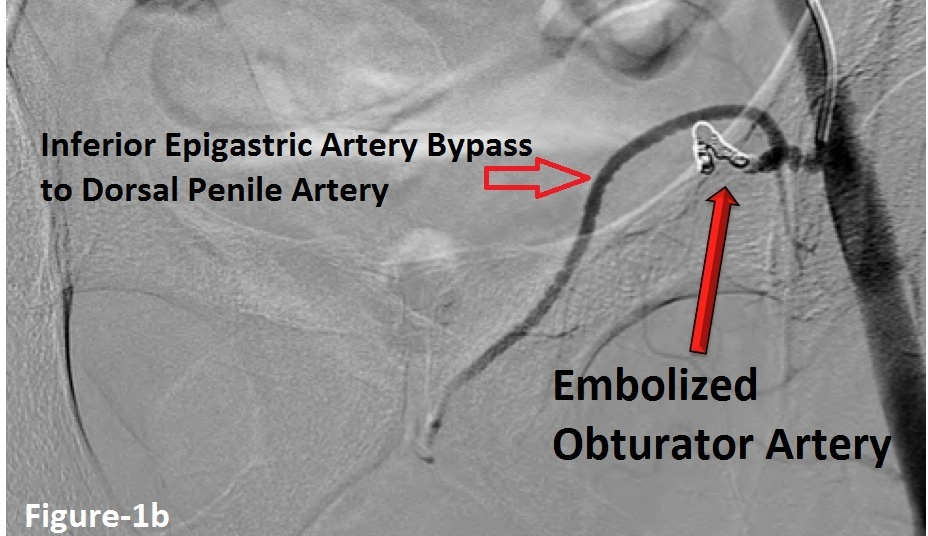
Post-embolization, with the solid red arrow marking the embolized stump of the aberrant obturator artery, and hollow red arrow indicating the intact anastomosis of the inferior-epigastric artery to the dorsal penile artery

== Treatment ==
Percutaneous coil embolization of the aberrant obturator artery was performed. Arterial flow rapidly improved through the left dorsal penile artery, and brisk opacification was seen through to the glans penis. Post-procedure, the patient experienced an immediate improvement in erectile function.

=== Considerations ===
Penile revascularization is a specialized vascular-surgical treatment option for erectile dysfunction. The 2009 International Consultation on Sexual Dysfunctions recommended that revascularization be limited to nonsmoker, nondiabetic men younger than 55 years of age with isolated stenosis of the internal pudendal artery with absence of venous leak. Patients with persistent erectile dysfunction after revascularization may benefit from repeat penile duplex ultrasound and pelvic angiography to evaluate the status of the bypass graft and to exclude the presence of a PASS as the cause. The prevalence of an aberrant obturator artery arising from the inferior epigastric artery is approximately 10.5%. If an aberrant obturator artery is visualized arising from the inferior epigastric artery prior to surgical penile revascularization, consideration should be given toward using an alternative source artery or to embolization to avoid the creation of a penile artery shunt syndrome encountered in this described case.

== History ==
Penile artery shunt syndrome (PASS) was initially described in a patient who underwent penile revascularization surgery for isolated left cavernosal artery stenosis in the absence of systemic vascular risk factors. An end-to-end anastomosis of the left inferior epigastric artery to the left dorsal penile artery was created using a previously described technique. After technically successful revascularization surgery, the patient continued to have post-operative erectile dysfunction despite documented patency of the surgical graft by penile duplex ultrasonography.

Pelvic angiography was performed on the patient, revealing an aberrant obturator artery originating from the inferior epigastric artery. The study revealed markedly sluggish forward flow visualized through the anastomosis to the left dorsal penile artery, with dominant flow in the left inferior epigastric artery to the obturator artery and its branches. This culminated in reduced blood flow to the penis.

== See also ==
- Venous leak
