= Sclerosing lymphangitis =

- Specialty: Dermatology

Sclerosing lymphangitis, also known as lymphangiosclerosis or sclerotic lymphangitis, is a skin condition characterized by a cordlike structure encircling the coronal sulcus of the penis, or running the length of the shaft, that has been attributed to trauma during vigorous sexual play.

Nonvenereal sclerosing lymphangitis is a penile lesion consisting of a minimally tender, indurated cord involving the coronal sulcus and occasionally adjacent distal penile skin. The condition involves the hardening of a lymph vessel connected to a vein in the penis. It can look like a thick cord and can feel like a hardened, almost calcified or fibrous, vein, however it tends to not share the common blue tint with a vein. It can be felt as a hardened lump or "vein" even when the penis is flaccid, and is even more prominent during an erection. This disorder is fairly common and most often occurs after vigorous sexual activity and resolves spontaneously.

== Cause ==
Etiology of sclerosing lymphangitis is unknown but has been postulated to be secondary to thrombosis of lymphatic vessels.

== Management ==
In most cases it tends to go away if given rest and more gentle care, for example by use of lubricants. Even without rest or gentle care, in some cases it will simply disappear after a few weeks on its own. Spontaneous recovery can occur anywhere within a couple weeks to several months.

Although it is commonly recommended the patient abstain from sexual activity during recovery, there is no evidence that this expedites resolution or that engaging in sexual activity worsens the condition.

== See also ==
- Skin lesion
