= Genital regeneration =

Range of medical treatments for genital anomalies

Genital regeneration encompasses various forms of treatment for genital anomalies. The goal of these treatments is to restore form and function to male and female genitalia by taking advantage of innate responses in the body. In order to do this, doctors have experimented with stem cells and extracellular matrix to provide a framework for regenerating missing structures. More research is needed to successfully move the science from laboratory trials to routine procedures.

Patients who can benefit most from this field are those who have congenital defects, cancer, injuries that have excised parts of their genitalia (most notably soldiers in war), and men looking to reverse circumcision and women wishing to reverse forms of female genital mutilation. As is the case in most scientific pursuits, these accomplishments might be applied to other forms of regeneration and vice versa as scientists continue to study tissue engineering.

== Autologous cell therapies ==
In the last decade, there have been notable accomplishments in utilizing extracellular matrices (ECM) and stem cells to reconstruct lost tissue. These cover a range of structures including the genitals. Professor Atala and his group at Wake Forest University's Institute of Regenerative Medicine have successfully regenerated fully functioning rabbit penises that were excised for the sake of the experiment. Autologous cells were attached to a three-dimensional collagen matrix. Once formed, the structure was attached and tested for functionality.

An Italian doctor named Dr. Cinzia Marchese has successfully reconstructed the inner mucosal lining of congenitally deformed vaginas by using an enzyme to break down the abnormal lining, then inserting stem cells to remodel the walls and restore normal functionality.

There are currently no therapies available for men attempting to clinically regenerate structures of the human penis. Also, for women there are no therapies that use autologous cells to regenerate the clitoris, sometimes removed in cases of female genital mutilation.

== Other therapies ==
The following therapies do not rely on autologous cells:

A vibration technique developed by Ellen L. Barnard and Myrtile Wilhite claims to promote regeneration in the vaginal cell lining. A topical cream developed by Lyle Corporate Development, Inc., claims to encourage regeneration of tissues in the vulva that have undergone cellular hypoxia.

There are manual reconstruction techniques such as those developed by French surgeon Pierre Foldès. His procedure provides women with a clitoris, but is not considered a regenerative medicine.

== Organizations ==
Some organizations which perform research into, or conduct regeneration procedures, include the Wake Forest Institute for Regenerative Medicine, the United States Department of Defense, and the California Institute for Regenerative Medicine.

== See also ==
- Gender-affirming surgery - surgery that involves replacement of genitals of one sex with genitals of the other sex
- Foreskin restoration - process, sometimes involving surgery, that grows new penile tissue via tissue expansion
