= Glans insufficiency syndrome =

- Other names: Soft glans, cold glans, isolated glans insufficiency, glans insufficiency, floppy glans syndrome (FGS)
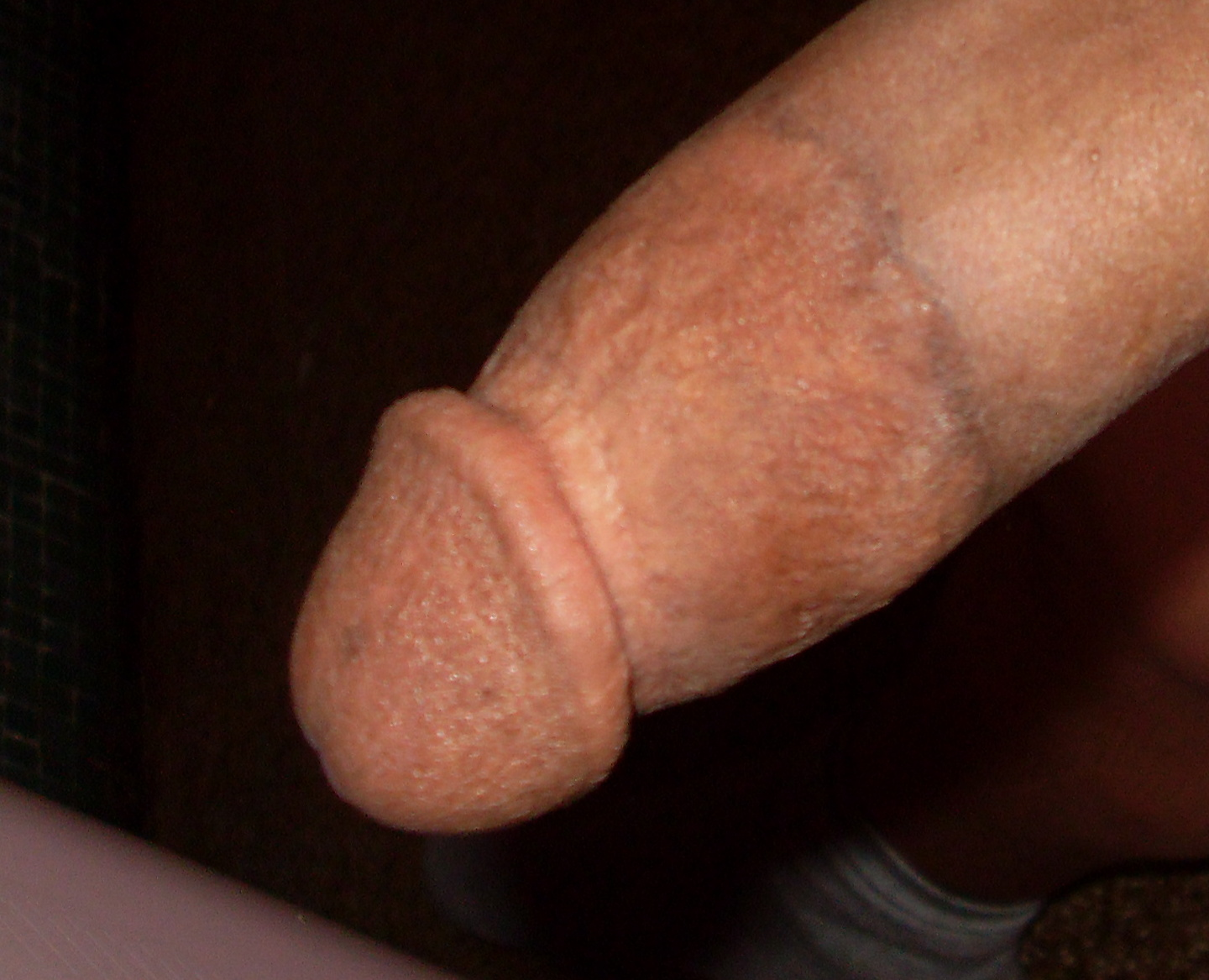
- Erect and circumcised human penis with partial balanic engorgement
- Specialty: Andrology
- Symptoms: Soft glans penis
- Frequency: 4 - 60% (following anterior urethroplasty)

Glans insufficiency syndrome, also known as soft glans, cold glans, or glans insufficiency, is a medical condition characterized by the persistent inability of the glans penis to achieve and maintain an erect or turgid state during sexual arousal, remaining soft and cold. This condition can have an impact on a person's sexual function, including decreased sensitivity, difficulty in maintaining an erection, and overall quality of life.

This condition is typically diagnosed among individuals who have undergone penile implant surgery, and is often underdiagnosed in the general population due to its complexity and the lack of clear nomenclature.

== Pathophysiology ==
Most commonly three distinct pathophysiologies have been hypothesized:

- Failure to initiate occurs due to neurologic injury affecting motor nerves such as dorsal nerve of the penis in the corpus spongiosum, leading to difficulties in activating arterial inflow and veno-occlusive processes. Common after urethral stricture surgery.
- Failure to fill results from arterial occlusive disease within dorsal or spongiosal arteries, preventing adequate arterial perfusion to the spongiosal erectile tissue. Linked to atherosclerosis or perineal trauma.
- Failure to store involves fibrosis of the erectile tissue in the corpus spongiosum, causing an inability to provide compressive pressure on sub-tunical venules and causing veno-occlusive dysfunction (VOD). This can result from various causes, including fibrosis in spongiosal erectile tissue from vascular risk factors, perineal trauma, surgical injuries, or priapism treatment.

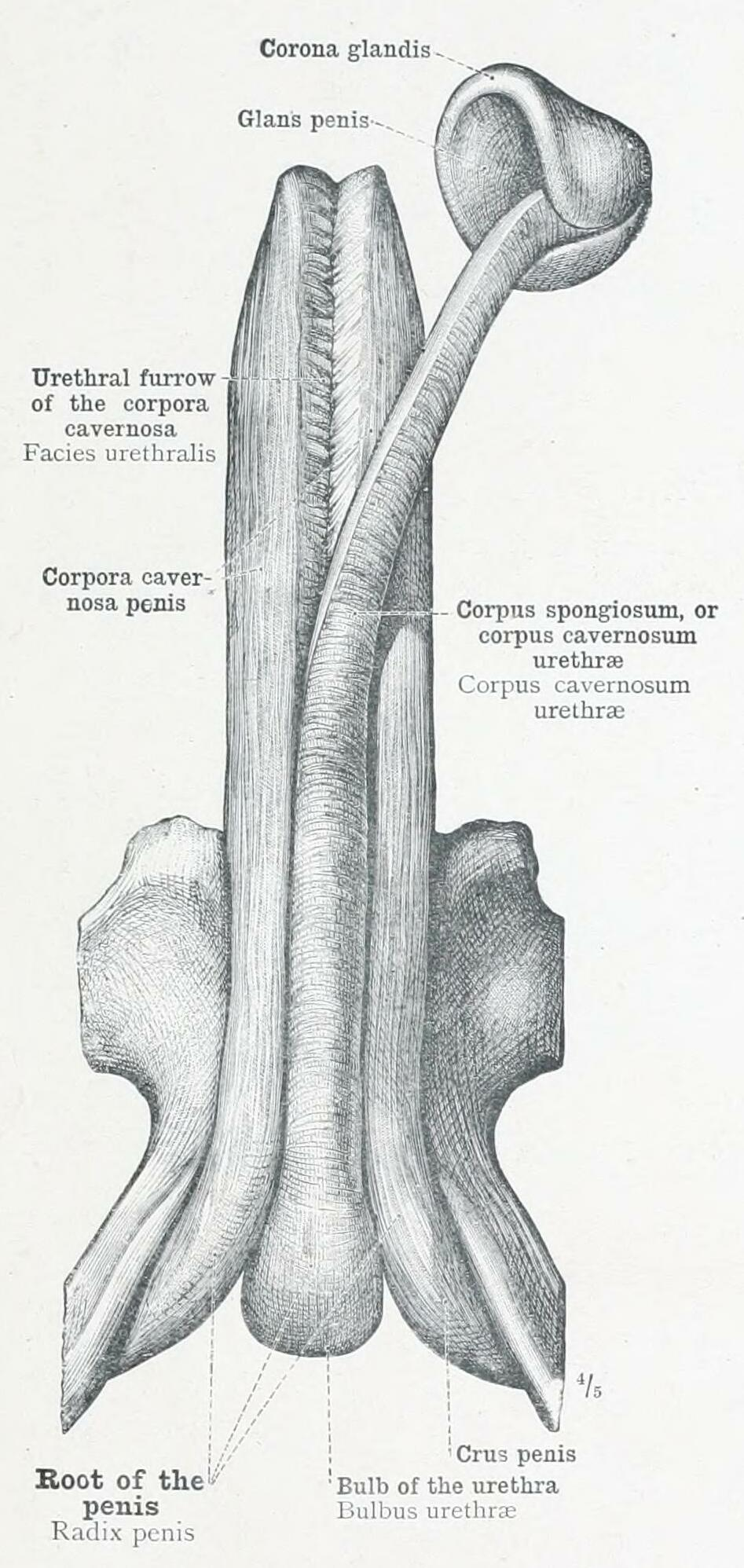
Corpus spongiosum of a human penis

== Causes ==
The exact causes of soft glans syndrome remain complex and multifactorial, potentially involving issues related to blood flow, nervous system function, hormonal imbalances, medication side effects, or trauma.

Possible explanation of lack of balanic engorgement is that the pressure within the glans penis during an erection is consistently lower than that within the corpora cavernosa. Glans engorgement does not typically occur in response to intracavernous injections of vasoactive agents, and it is frequently absent following the implantation of a penile prosthesis.

== Prevalence ==
Patients who have undergone urethroplasty and penile implantation may encounter the glans remaining soft and cold despite the expected response to sexual stimulation. It has been reported that from 4 to 60% of people who underwent anterior urethroplasty surgery had a glans insufficiency syndrome.

== Treatment ==
Treatment options may include mechanical, pharmacologic, or surgical approaches. Surgical interventions may involve the ligation of veins and the closure of iatrogenic shunts; however, their effectiveness remains a topic of limited research.

In individuals who have undergone penile implantation, the issue was addressed through a combination of penile implant revision and a balanic enhancement procedure, which improved the outcome by alleviating cold glans syndrome. The method included venous stripping procedure of the retrocoronal plexus, followed by ligation of the dorsal deep vein (DDV) and circumflex veins (CVs) at the penile hilum.

In a 1990 study, a treatment approach was used to repair isolated glans insufficiency due to venous leakage. The diagnosis was established by observing the rapid drainage of a contrast agent through the deep dorsal vein while conducting pharmacodynamic ultrasonography. The treatment involved the surgical resection and ligation of a segment of the deep dorsal vein, a procedure that aimed to reduce pathologic venous outflow from the glans during erections. This treatment effectively restored normal glans tumescence.

Veins and arteries of a human penis in cross section

== See also ==
- Hard flaccid syndrome
- Venous leak
- Penile artery shunt syndrome
