= Buried penis =

Male congenital condition

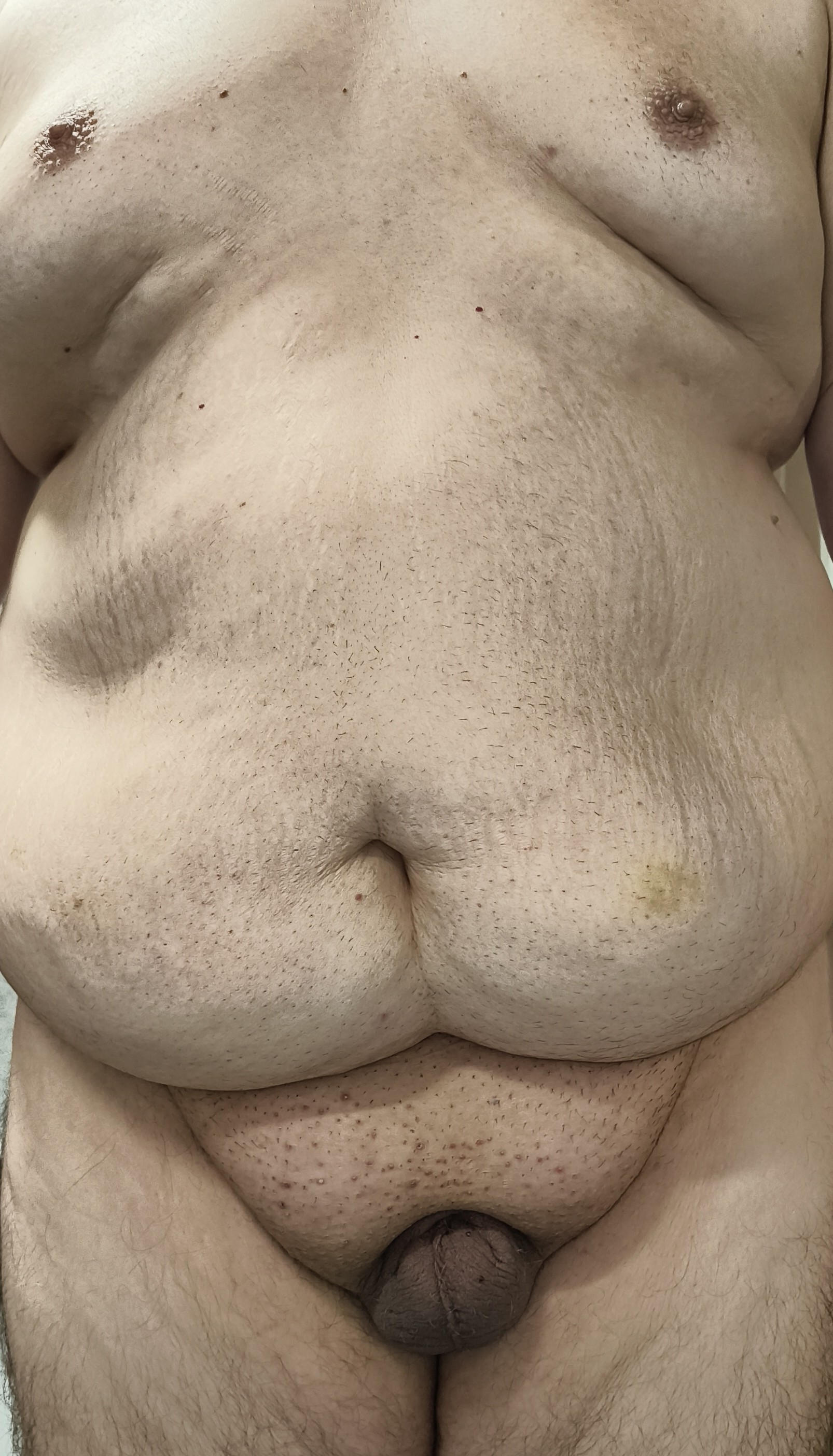
Clinical presentation of a buried penis in an adult male with significant central obesity. The penile shaft is completely concealed by the descent of a large abdominal panniculus and a prominent suprapubic fat pad.

Buried penis, also called hidden penis or retractile penis, is a congenital or acquired condition in which the penis is partially or completely hidden below the surface of the skin. A buried penis can lead to urinary difficulties, poor hygiene, infection, and inhibition of normal sexual function.

Buried penis is different from micropenis, which is an abnormally small, normally structured penis with a stretched penile length of less than 2.5 standard deviations below the mean for age or stage of sexual development of the patient.

== History ==
Buried penis was first described by Edward Lawrence Keyes in 1919 as the apparent absence of the penis due to the penis being buried beneath the skin of the abdomen, thigh, or scrotum. Further research was done by Maurice Campbell in 1951, when he reported on the penis being buried beneath subcutaneous fat of the scrotum, perineum, hypogastrium, and thigh.

== Causes ==
=== Congenital ===
A buried penis may be apparent at birth in some cases, often due to a paucity of penile shaft skin and a short penile shaft.

=== Acquired ===
==== Obesity ====
While not every obese male has the buried penis condition, 87% of men that received surgical treatment for buried penis were reported to be obese. Significant overlying abdominal fat can also create an environment that encourages bacterial and fungal growth. Obesity can also increase the likelihood of the development of type II diabetes mellitus, which is characterized by increased susceptibility to infections, making it difficult to successfully and promptly manage the buried penis condition. Such recurring infections can also lead to scar contracture, which can cause the prepubic skin to shift over the shaft and glans, thus invaginating the shaft's skin and leading to a buried penis.

==== Penoscrotal lymphodema ====
While an uncommon cause, penoscrotal lymphodema causes a deformity of the shaft and scrotum, resulting in a buried penis.

==== Overly aggressive circumcision ====
In some cases of circumcision, too much foreskin is removed or the suture line constricts, causing cicatricial scarring, which can trap the penis in the remaining foreskin or push the penis into the suprapubic area and lead to a buried penis.

==== Balanitis xerotica obliterans (BXO) ====
BXO is a chronic inflammatory dermatological process that causes sclerosis of the glans, shaft, prepuce, or urethra. This can result in a cicatrix of the distal penis and its entrapment.

==== Dysgenic dartos ====
Dysgenic dartos is a condition characterized by a lack of dorsal support together with the hypermobility of the ventral skin and the lack of proper attachment between the dartos and the penis. This can enable the penis to "telescope" into the scrotum, thus creating a buried penis.

== Treatment ==
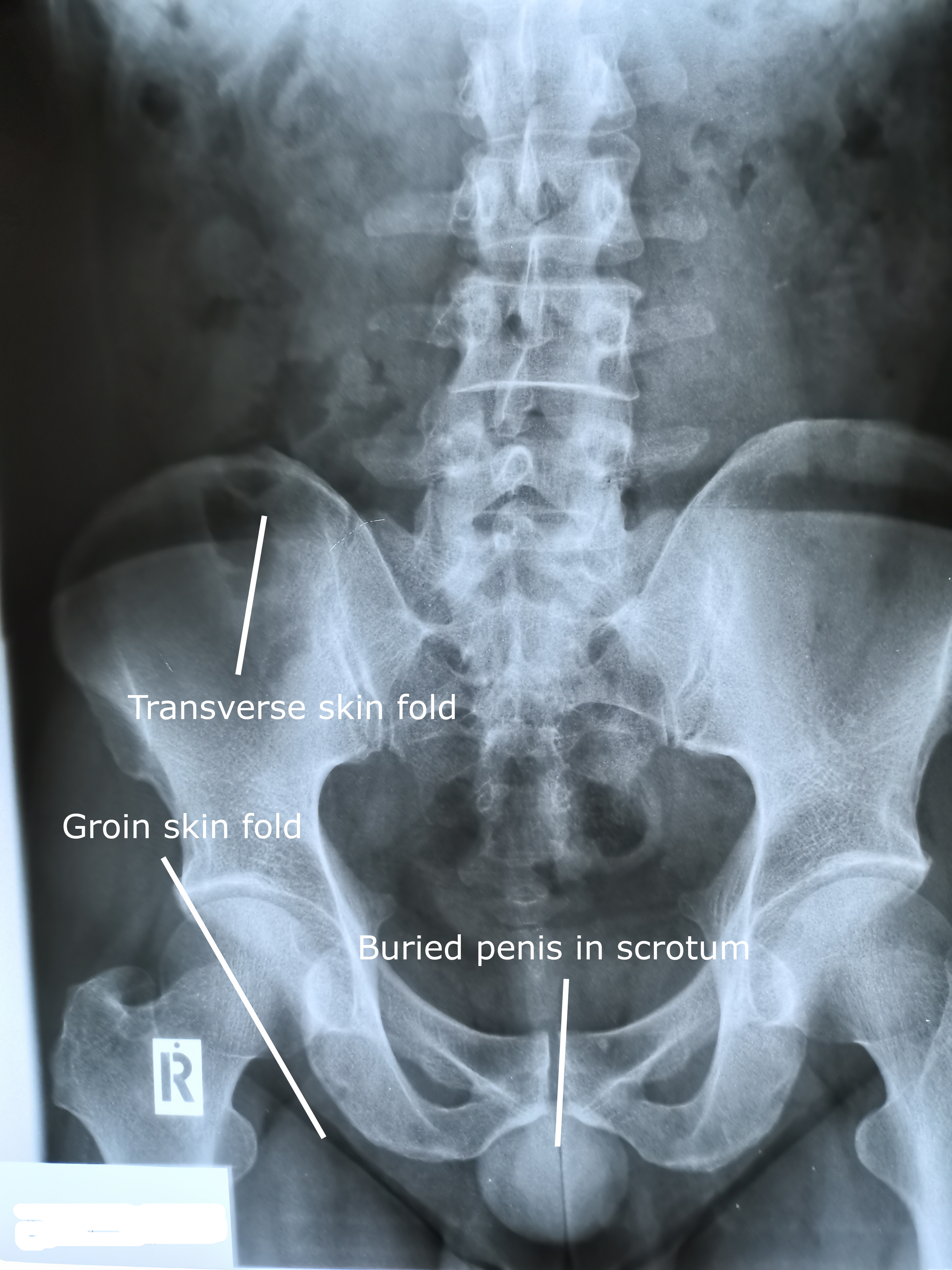
KUB radiograph demonstrating buried penis with multiple overlying skin folds.

The condition may resolve itself without any intervention in very young children; however, patients may eventually need definitive reconstructive surgery. Urgent surgery may be necessary if infection is present. Congenitial buried penis can be corrected surgically in childhood by anchoring the corpora cavernosa to dartos bundles at the penile base.

Surgical options could include the detachment of the ligaments connecting the base of the penis to the pubic bone; the performance of skin grafts to cover areas of the penis requiring additional skin; liposuction using catheters to suck out fat cells under the skin from the area around the penis; an abdominoplasty in which excess fat and skin from the region are removed; an escutheonectomy in which the pad of fat just above the pubic area is removed; or a panniculectomy in which the panniculus, excess tissue, and skin that hangs over the genitals and thighs are removed. In a video demonstrating the use of a panniculectomy in the repair of adult buried penis, Dr. Bryan Voelzke and his colleagues emphasized the need to tack the suprapubic fat pad to the periosteum of the symphysis pubis as well as the importance of not pulling down the peno-scrotal junction and peno-abdominal junction just in order to further expose the penis.

King IC, Tahir A, Ramanathan C, and Siddiqui H developed a modified treatment algorithm employing a single surgical technique consisting primarily of scar release and the mobilization of the skin of the penis.

An article published in August 2019 by Dr. James J. Elist reported that a procedure involving the insertion of a subcutaneous soft silicone penile implant was successful in reversing the condition of adult acquired buried penis.

== See also ==
- Micropenis
- Phalloplasty
- Webbed penis
- Human penis size
