= Venous leak =

- Other names: Venogenic erectile dysfunction, penile venous insufficiency
- Specialty: Andrology
- Complications: Erectile dysfunction
- Causes: Chronic venous insufficiency, varicose veins, traumatic damage to vascular walls, genetics
- Treatment: Ligation of leaking veins, lifestyle changes
- Frequency: Arterial insufficiency: Younger than 45 years old - 12% Older than 45 years old - 19.6% (mild), 5.9% (severe) Venous leakage: 7.84% (of 67 patients)

Venous leak, also called venogenic erectile dysfunction and penile venous insufficiency, is one category of vascular-induced (vasculogenic) impotence – a cause of erectile dysfunction in males. It affects all ages, being particularly awkward in young men. Much about venous leaks has not reached a consensus among the medical community, and many aspects of the condition, particularly its treatment strategies, are controversial. The prevalence of the condition is still unknown, although some sources claim it to be a common cause of erectile dysfunction.

== Signs and symptoms ==
Many men with venogenic erectile dysfunction start having trouble with their erections from a young age. Common complaints include a chronic soft erection insufficient for sexual intercourse, position-dependent erectile rigidity, difficulty achieving erections, difficulty maintaining erections without constant manual stimulation, loss of penile length and girth, and a soft glans of the penis during erection that is not fully engorged (also known as cold glans syndrome).

Physicians often look for signs that suggest an organic cause of erectile dysfunction rather than a psycho-osmotic cause in making a diagnosis of venous leak. Such suggestive signs include (1) erectile dysfunction that is persistent on all occasions where an erection is required, including with a partner and without a partner during masturbation, (2) Loss of quality of morning erections, (3) Loss of quality of spontaneous erections, and (4) multi-treatment resistance to traditional erectile dysfunction medications including sildenafil and intracavernosal injection therapy.

== Causes ==
Venous leak is an inability to maintain an erection in the presence of sufficient arterial blood flow through the cavernosal arteries of the penis. The defect lies in the excessive drainage of veins in the cavernosal tissue of the penis, which undermines normal erectile function. This provides extraordinary venous drainage from the corpora cavernosa of the penis despite the existence of a rigid erection and fails to adequately trap blood inside the corporeal chambers to maintain an erection of adequate strength or adequate length of time. It is still disputed as to what causes the excessive leakiness that is characteristic of the condition. However, it is mostly thought that the defect is in the connective tissue of the tunica albuginea surrounding the penile veins, most importantly, the deep dorsal vein of the penis, a pair of cavernosal veins, and two pairs of para-arterial veins between the Buck's fascia and the tunica albuginea of the penis.

Recently hemodynamic studies were conducted in both fresh and defrosted human cadavers in which a rigid erection was without exception attainable despite cavernosal tissue having lost its extensibility in cadaveric sinusoids. This implies a rigid penile erection is just a mechanical event and, consequently, that penile veins play a pivotal role in achieving a rigid erection. This is clearly a ramification of endorsing the determinant role of the erection-related veins in human erectile function.

Furthermore, cavernosograms demonstrate that excessively leaky veins can cause drainage of the corpora cavernosa. Histological specimens of cavernosal tissue in patients with confirmed veno-occlusive disease (VOD) show changes in the structure of collagen and elastin making up the connective tissue of the penis when compared to a control group. These changes may be responsible for such symptoms. In addition, other possible causes include psychological stress, testosterone deficiency, neurotic deficit, a drug's adverse influence, iatrogenic, and chronic systemic diseases such as diabetes and low urinary tract symptoms.

== Treatment ==
Since 1873, when a hypertonic solution was injected into the large penile vein in an attempt to treat impotence and resulting in reduced venous drainage away from the corpora cavernosa, there has been much controversy concerning the most ideal milieu for applying Pascal's law as it relates to this area of study.

Because many males are not responding to standard medical therapy (including PDE-5 inhibitor, intracavernosal injection therapy, and coil embolization etc.), a penile venous stripping seems to be a unique treatment. Nevertheless, for those with erectile dysfunction that remains resistant to less-invasive treatments, penile implant remains the solution.
