= Views on circumcision =

Cultural, social and religious views

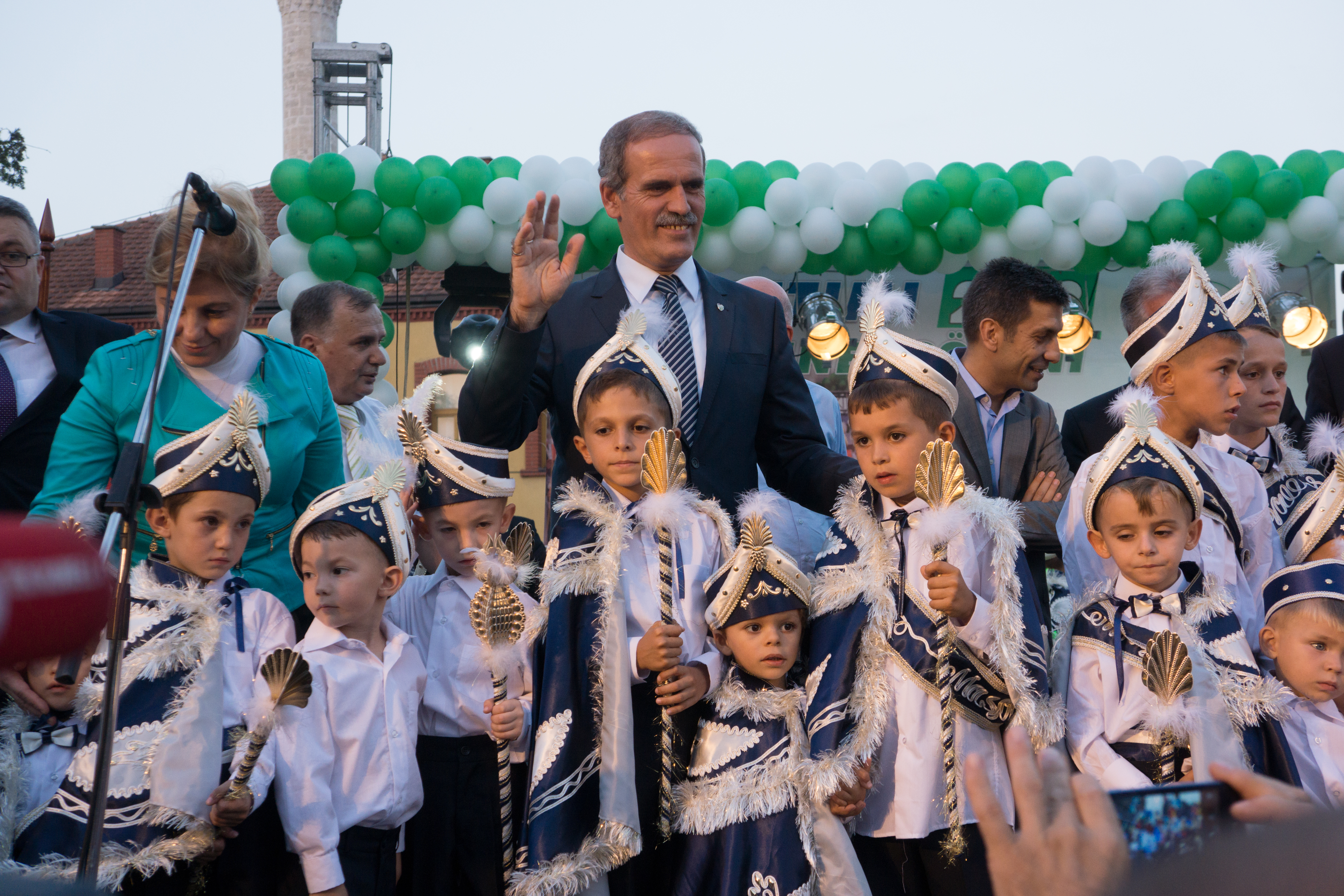
Circumcision ceremony in Skopje, North Macedonia

Circumcision has played a significant cultural, social, and religious role in various global cultures over the course of world history. This has subsequently led to widely varying views related to the practice.

== Abrahamic faiths ==
The rite plays a major role in the Abrahamic faiths. Mainstream forms of Judaism view the practice as integral to the faith and one of the most important religious obligations, while differing schools of interpretation within Islam view it either as a religious obligation or recommendation.

Circumcision has also played a major role in Christian history and theology. Covenant theology largely views the Christian sacrament of baptism as fulfilling the Israelite practice of circumcision, both being signs and seals of the covenant of grace. With the exception of the Coptics, Ethiopian Orthodox and Eritrean Orthodox where circumcision is a common, integral or required practice for members of these churches, the large majority of mainstream Christian denominations maintain a neutral position on it in with respect to medical or cultural reasons, although all of them honor the circumcision of Jesus and condemn the rite when it is viewed as a means or requirement towards an individual's justification. According to Scholar Heather L. Armstrong of University of Southampton, many Christians have been circumcised for reasons such as family preferences, varying Biblical interpretation by individuals, medical or cultural reasons.

Samaritanism views the circumcision as an integral and central religious obligation that is one of the most important commandments for Samaritans. Circumcision is widely practiced by the Druze. The procedure is practiced as a cultural tradition, and has no religious significance in the Druze faith. Some Druses do not circumcise their male children, and refuse to observe what they see as a "common Muslim practice".

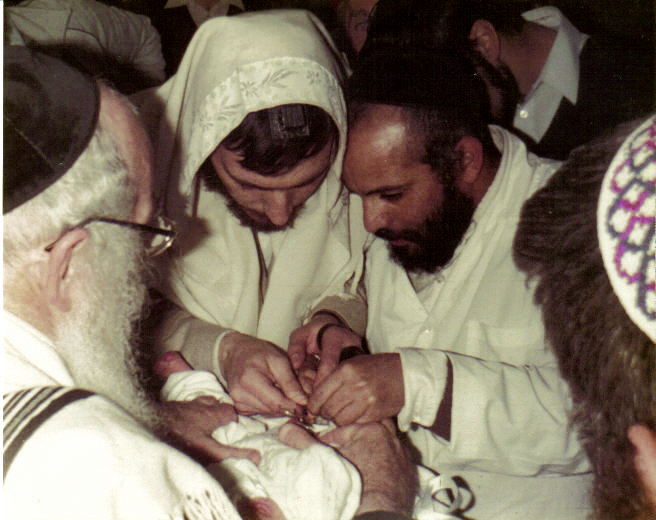
Preparing for a Jewish ritual circumcision

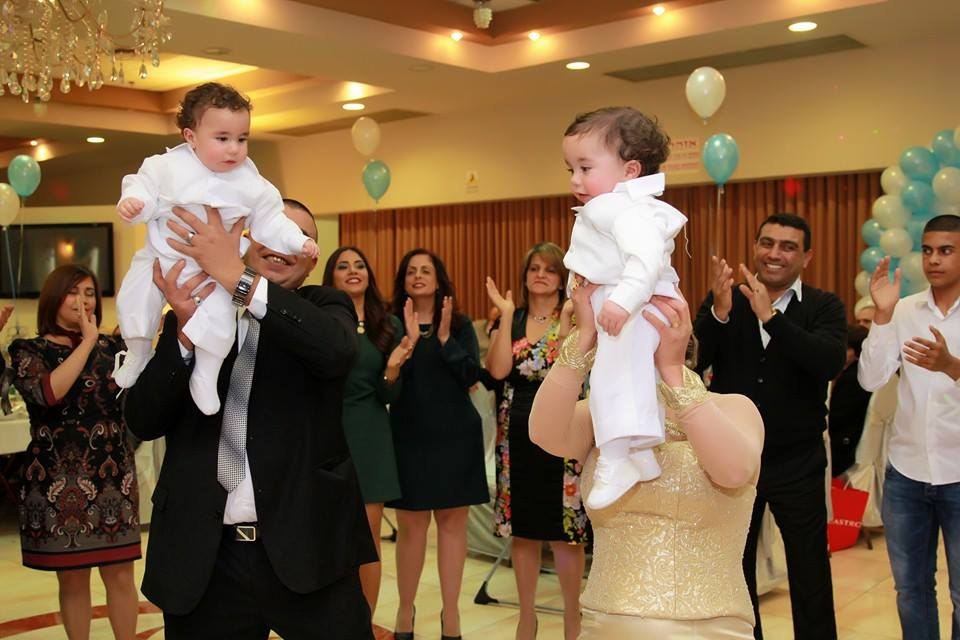
Coptic Christian Children wearing traditional circumcision costumes

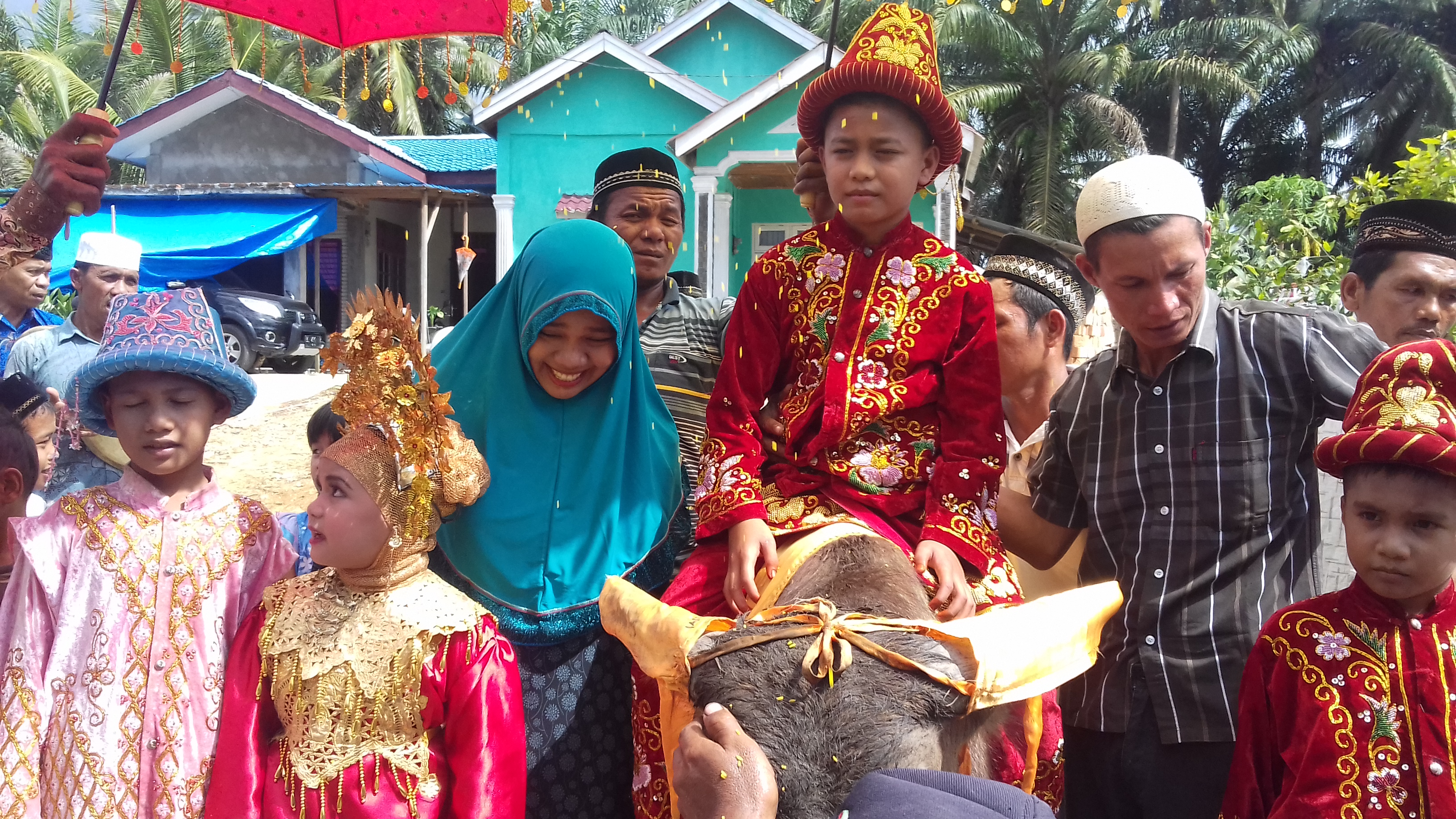
Indonesian Muslim boy wearing traditional circumcision costume

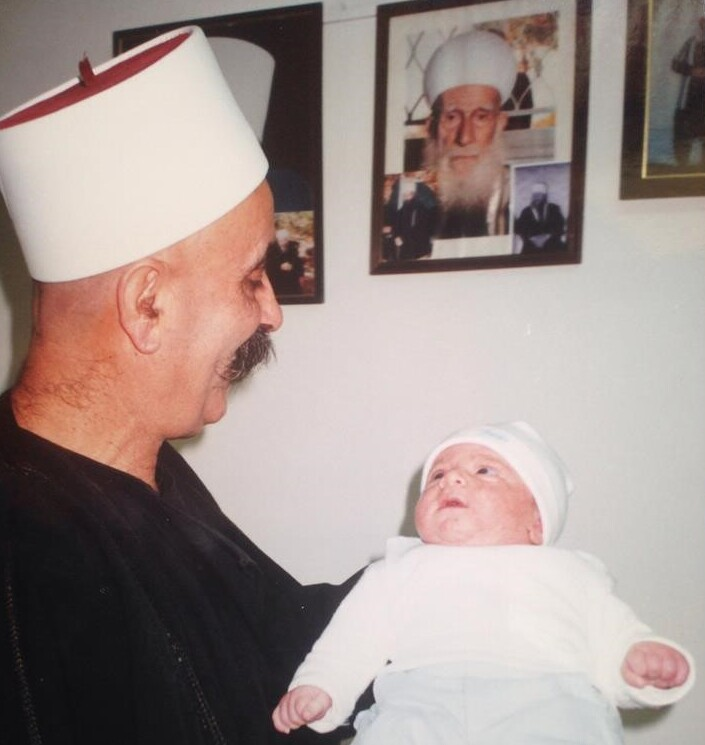
Preparing for a ritual circumcision on a Druze child

== Indian faiths ==
Indian religions, such as Hinduism and Sikhism, strongly prohibit the practice of routine circumcision. Hinduism discourages non-medical circumcision, as according to them, the body is made by the almighty God, and nobody has right to alter it without the consent of the person themself. Sikhism does not require the elective circumcision of its followers and strongly criticizes the practice. Sikh infants are not circumcised. Buddhism appears to have a neutral view on circumcision.

== African cultures ==
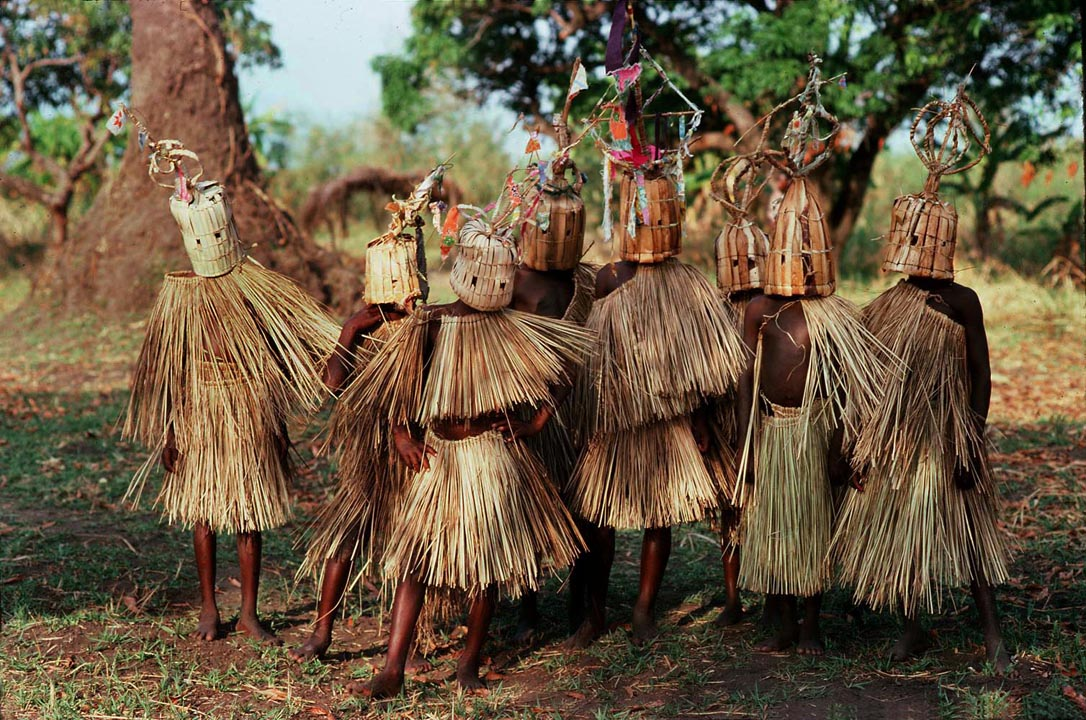
9–10-year-old boys of the Yao tribe in Malawi participating in circumcision and initiation rites

Circumcision rituals in Africa, and the rites of initiation in Africa have many forms. In his 1949 book, Günter Wagner wrote: "...the frequent resemblance between details of ceremonial procedure in areas thousands of kilometres apart, indicate that the circumcision ritual has an old tradition behind it..." Circumcision is prevalent among 92% of men in North Africa and around 62% in Sub-Saharan Africa. In western and northern parts of Africa it is mainly performed on newborns for religious reasons, whereas in southern parts of Africa it is rarely performed on infants, instead being a rite of passage into manhood.

Some African and Eastern Christian denominations view male circumcision is an integral or established practice, and require that their male members undergo circumcision. Circumcision is near-universal among Coptic Christians, Ethiopian Orthodox and Eritrean Orthodox. Worshipers often practice circumcision as a rite of passage, although the Ethiopian Orthodox specifically recommends against circumcision.

Certain African cultural groups, such as the Yoruba and the Igbo of Nigeria, customarily circumcise their infant sons. The procedure is also practiced by some cultural groups or individual family lines in Sudan, Democratic Republic of the Congo, Uganda and in southern Africa. For some of these groups, circumcision appears to be purely cultural, done with no particular religious significance or intention to distinguish members of a group. For others, circumcision might be done for purification, or it may be interpreted as a mark of subjugation. Among these groups, even when circumcision is done for reasons of tradition, it is often done in hospitals.

== Asian cultures ==
In the Philippines, where four-fifths of Filipinos profess Roman Catholicism, circumcision is known as "tuli" and is generally viewed as a rite of passage. Approximately 90% of adult Filipino men are circumcised. According to the United Nations World Health Organisation:

In the Philippines, where circumcision is almost universal and typically occurs at age 10–14 years, a survey of boys found strong evidence of social determinants, with two thirds of boys choosing to be circumcised simply "to avoid being uncircumcised", and 41% stating that it was "part of the tradition"

The overall prevalence of circumcision in South Korea increased markedly in the second half of the 20th century, rising from near zero around 1950 to about 60% in 2000, with the most significant jumps in the last two decades of that time period. This is probably due to the influence of the United States, which established a trusteeship for the country following World War II.

Neither the Avesta nor the Zoroastrian Pahlavi texts mention circumcision, traditionally, Zoroastrians do not practice circumcision. Circumcision is not required in Yazidism, but is practiced by some Yazidis due to regional customs. The ritual is usually performed soon after birth, it takes place on the knees of the kerîf (approximately "godfather"), with whom the child will have a life-long formal relationship.

Circumcision is forbidden in Mandaeism, and the sign of the Jews given to Abraham by God, circumcision, is considered abhorrent by the Mandaeans. According to the Mandaean doctrine a circumcised man cannot serve as a Mandaean priest.

== Australian cultures ==
Circumcision is part of initiation rites in some Pacific Islander, and Aboriginal Australian traditions in areas such as Arnhem Land, where the practice was introduced by Makassan traders from Sulawesi in the Indonesian Archipelago. Some Aboriginal people use circumcision as a test of bravery and self-control as a part of a rite of passage into manhood, which results in full societal and ceremonial membership. Circumcision ceremonies among certain Aboriginal societies are noted for their painful nature, including subincision in the Western Desert cultural bloc.

In the Pacific, ritual circumcision is nearly universal in the Melanesian islands of Fiji and Vanuatu. Circumcision is also commonly practiced in the Polynesian islands of Samoa, Tonga, Niue, and Tikopia. In Samoa, it is accompanied by a celebration.
