= Hard flaccid syndrome =

Abnormally rigid state of the penis without sexual arousal

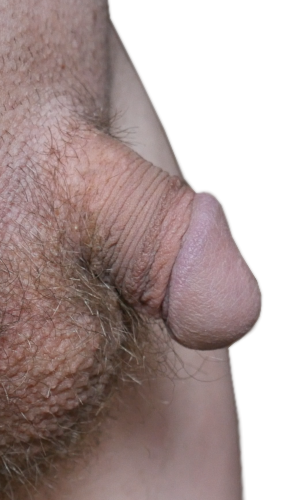
- A penis in the "hard flaccid" state
- Specialty: Urology, sexual medicine, neurology, men's health
- Symptoms: A flaccid penis that remains in a firm, semi-rigid state in the absence of sexual arousal
- Usual onset: Typically following a traumatic event (an injury to the penis, blunt perineal trauma, cauda equina)
- Causes: Excessive sympathetic activity in the erectile smooth muscle tissue
- Risk factors: Blunt or culmulative trauma to the penis and/or the pelvic floor.
- Diagnostic method: Overwhelmingly self-diagnosed
- Treatment: Definitive treatment does not currently exist

Hard flaccid syndrome (HFS), also known as hard flaccid (HF), is a rare acquired dysautonomic condition characterized by a flaccid penis that remains in a firm, semi-rigid state in the absence of sexual arousal. Patients often describe their flaccid penis as firm to the touch, rubbery, shrunken, and retracted, frequently accompanied by pain, discomfort, and various other symptoms. While the condition is not fully understood, current research indicates that HFS results from excessive sympathetic nervous system activity in the smooth muscle tissue of the penis, triggered by a pathological activation of a proposed pelvic/pudendal-hypogastric reflex. Among other causes, injuries to the erect penis, blunt trauma to the pelvis or perineum, and damage to the cauda equina are thought to induce this reflex. Although unproven, axon sprouting in sympathetic ganglia following a peripheral nerve injury is a possible explanation for HFS. The majority of patients are in their 20s and 30s, with symptoms severely affecting their quality of life. Treatment typically involves a combination of alpha blockers and PDE5 inhibitors, although there is limited evidence supporting their efficacy. Due to the lack of comprehensive understanding and awareness within the scientific and medical communities, there is currently no definitive treatment for HFS.

== Signs and symptoms ==
The most obvious, unmistakable, and defining symptom of hard flaccid syndrome is a penis that remains in a firm, semi-rigid state in the absence of sexual arousal. The flaccid penis will appear shrunken, contracted, and upon palpation will feel hard and non-compressible. This typically worsens when the patient is in a standing position. The skin on the shaft of the flaccid penis may also have folds or wrinkles, resembling gastric and vaginal rugae.

=== Other signs and symptoms ===
In addition to a "hard flaccid" penis, patients may also experience erectile dysfunction (difficulty achieving or maintaining an erection; painful or tight erections; penis does not fill up completely when getting an erection; no morning erections; no nocturnal erections; no spontaneous erections; painful nocturnal erections), sensory changes (a persistent feeling of coldness in the glans, shaft, or entire penis; paresthesia or pins and needles in or around the penis; dysesthesia or an unpleasant, abnormal sense of touch in or around the penis; complete or partial loss of erogenous sensation to the penis; complete or partial loss of tactile feeling to the penis including temperature, pressure, vibration, or texture; penis feels "hollow", "disconnected" or unstable, as if it was not a part of the body), physical or structural changes to the penis (an hourglass or bottleneck shape to the penis during the flaccid or semi-erect states; engorged veins or spider veins; discoloration of the skin of the penis; soft glans; "long flaccid", where the flaccid penis is more extended than it should be and either feels firm or like a balloon filled with water; tilt of the penis to one side while flaccid, erect, or both; rotation of the penis when erect), pain (pain in or around the penis; pain in or around the penis or perineum after ejaculation), testicular retraction, urinary issues (incontinence; urgency; duel urine streams; a burning feeling when urinating), pelvic floor dysfunction, and constipation.

== Cause ==
Although not fully understood, the general consensus is that hard flaccid syndrome is caused by elevated sympathetic nervous system activity, or tone, in the penis following a peripheral nerve injury. This heightened activity leads to an excessive release of norepinephrine in the erectile smooth muscle tissue, causing relentless smooth muscle contraction, which produces the "hard flaccid" state, or the persistent firmness and semi-rigidity of the flaccid penis that is characteristic of the condition. The temporary resolution of the "hard flaccid" state through intracavernous injections of phentolamine, an α-adrenergic antagonist, supports this claim. HFS resembles a condition called complex regional pain syndrome (CRPS) in its presentation, as both are thought to arise from an isolated injury that triggers a pathological shift in nervous system activity, amplifying pain signals and symptoms beyond that of the original trauma.

=== The "Goldstein theory" ===
In May 2023, Dr. Irwin Goldstein of San Diego Sexual Medicine and colleagues published an article in AUA News presenting a theory on the pathophysiology of hard flaccid syndrome. They hypothesized that the condition results from excessive sympathetic activity in the hypogastric nerve, induced by a pathological activation of a pelvic/pudendal-hypogastric reflex. The authors identified five potential anatomical sites where this reflex could be triggered:

- Region one pathology: The end organ (penis)
- Region two pathology: The pelvis or perineum
- Region three pathology: The cauda equina
- Region four pathology: The spinal cord
- Region five pathology: The brain

In a June 2024 interview with Stefan Buntrock on the "UroChannel" YouTube channel, Dr. Goldstein discussed region one pathology, stating, "I believe that's the vast majority of cases," suggesting that penile injuries are the primary cause of hard flaccid syndrome in most patients.

This is still considered the prevailing theory for the pathophysiology of hard flaccid syndrome.

==== Region one pathology ====
Region one pathology involves the end organ, or penis. Traumatic events or injuries to the erect penis are believed to trigger HFS in these cases. Region one is considered the most common pathology in patients with HFS.

Potential triggers:

- Rough or prolonged masturbation, such as edging or gooning
- Rough or prolonged sexual intercourse
- Penile enhancement/enlargement techniques, such as jelqing, the use of vacuum pumps, and traction devices

==== Region two pathology ====
Region two pathology involves the pelvic or perineal area. In these cases, the condition is likely attributed to pudendal nerve neuropathy.

Potential triggers:

- Blunt force trauma to the pelvis or perineum from activities such as horseback riding or bicycle riding

==== Region three pathology ====
Region three pathology involves the cauda equina, a cluster of spinal nerves at the lower end of the spinal cord, responsible for transmitting signals between the lower body and the brain. Pathological activation in this area can result from structural issues, including disc protrusions, Tarlov cysts, and annular tears. These can compress or irritate the cauda equina, and potentially lead to HFS. Patients with region three pathology typically show limited response to treatment, but some have experienced significant improvement or even full recovery following spinal surgery.

Potential triggers:

- Lumbosacral radiculopathy

==== Region four pathology ====
Region four pathology involves the spinal cord.

==== Region five pathology ====
Region five pathology involves the brain.

=== Sympathetic axon sprouting ===
In his June 2024 interview with Stefan Buntrock on the "UroChannel" YouTube channel, Dr. Irwin Goldstein discussed the potential link between hard flaccid syndrome and sympathetic axon sprouting. He referenced a study where injury to the sciatic nerve in rats led to sympathetic axon sprouting in the dorsal root ganglia. If applicable to HFS, damage to the pelvic and/or pudendal nerves could induce similar sprouting in sympathetic ganglia. Dr. Goldstein remarked, "The idea of this sprouting is making more sense as the real explanation for this, because once it sprouts, I don't know how you're supposed to stop that."

== Diagnosis ==
At present, there is no formalized schema or method for diagnosing hard flaccid syndrome in a clinical environment. Due to the condition's relative obscurity within the medical community, the majority of HFS patients diagnose themselves.

== Treatment ==
Definitive treatment for hard flaccid syndrome does not exist and current methods fail to relieve symptoms for patients. The complexity and poorly understood nature of HFS makes it very difficult to treat. As a result, there is a growing need for more research that can provide better outcomes for those suffering from this challenging condition.

== See also ==
- Sexual medicine
- Complex regional pain syndrome
- Male reproductive system
