= Human physical appearance =

Look, outward phenotype

Human physical appearance is the outward phenotype or look of human beings.

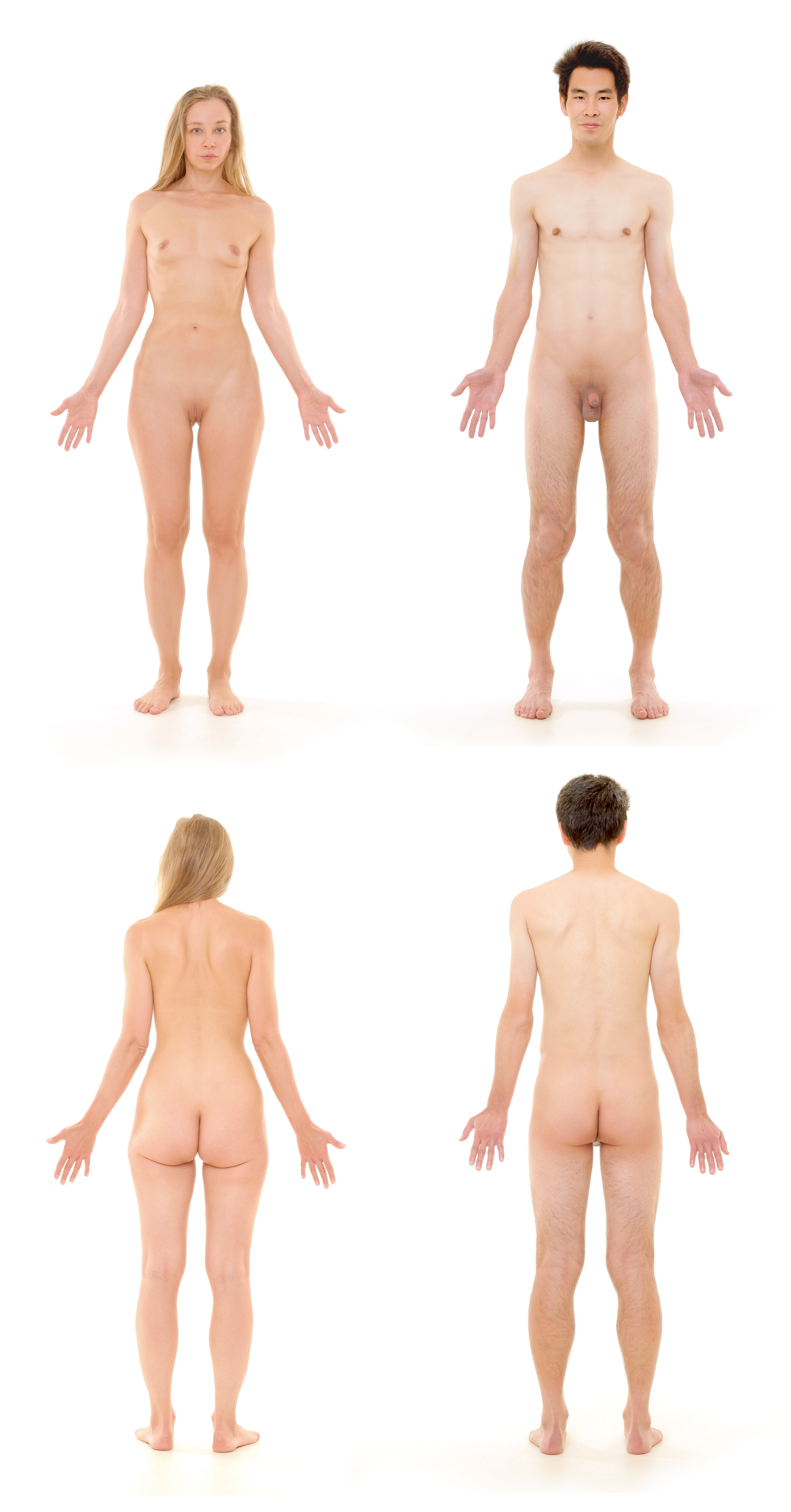
Image of a European female (left) and an East Asian male (right) human body seen from front (upper) and back (lower). Adult human bodies photographed whose naturally-occurring pubic, body, facial, but not head hair have been deliberately removed to show anatomy. Retouched with anterior and posterior views.

There are functionally infinite variations in human phenotypes, though society reduces the variability to distinct categories. The physical appearance of humans, in particular those attributes which are regarded as important for physical attractiveness, are believed by anthropologists to affect the development of personality significantly and social relations. Many humans are acutely sensitive to their physical appearance. Some differences in human appearance are genetic, others are the result of age, lifestyle or disease, and many are the result of personal adornment.

Perception of the human body is not only based on the visual look, but also on other sensory inputs, including voice and scent.

Some people have linked some differences with ethnicity, such as skeletal shape, prognathism or elongated stride. Different cultures place different degrees of emphasis on physical appearance and its importance to social status and other phenomena.

== Aspects ==
Various aspects are considered relevant to the physical appearance of humans.

=== Natural differences in body appearance ===
Humans are distributed across the globe except for Antarctica and form a variable species. In adults, the average weight varies from around 40 kg (88 pounds) for the smallest and most lightly built tropical people to around 80 kg (176 pounds) for the heavier northern peoples. Size also varies between the sexes, with the sexual dimorphism in humans being more pronounced than that of chimpanzees, but less than the dimorphism found in gorillas. The colouration of skin, hair and eyes also varies considerably, with darker pigmentation dominating in tropical climates and lighter in polar regions.

The following are non-exhaustive lists of causes and kinds of variations which are completely or partially unintentional.

Examples of unintentional causes of variation in body appearance:

- Development of the human body and ageing
- Disease and injury
- Genetic variation
- Sex differences

Examples of general anatomical or anthropometric variations:

- Body shape and proportions
- Body weight
- Height

Examples of variations of specific body parts:

- Body hair
- Ear (see earlobes)
- Face (see facial symmetry)
  - Eye
    Human eyes vary in color and shape (see epicanthic fold and eyelid variations). In addition, individuals have different distances between the pupils.
  - Mouth
  - Nose
    Human noses can exhibit a variety of nose shapes, including the aquiline nose.
- Hair
  Hair vary in terms of baldness, color and texture.
- Sex organs (see vaginal and penis size)
- Skin (see skin color)

There are also body and skin unconventional variations such as amputations or scars.

=== Short-term physiological changes ===
- Blushing, crying, fainting, hiccup, yawning, laughing, stuttering, sexual arousal, sweating, shivering, skin color changes due to sunshine or frost.

=== Clothing, personal effects, and intentional body modifications ===
- Clothing, including headgear and footwear; some clothes alter or mold the shape of the body (e.g. corset, support pantyhose, bra). As for footwear, high heels make a person look taller.
- Style and colour of haircut (see also mohawk, dreadlocks, braids, ponytail, wig, hairpin, facial hair, beard and moustache)
- Cosmetics, stage makeup, body paintings, permanent makeup
- Body modifications, such as body piercings, tattoos, scarification, subdermal implants
- Plastic surgery
- Jewelry such as necklaces, bracelets, rings, earrings
- Medical or body shape altering devices (e.g., tooth braces, bandages, casts, hearing aids, cervical collar, crutches, contact lenses of different colours, glasses, gold teeth). For example, the same person's appearance can be quite different, depending on whether they use any of the aforementioned modifications.
- Exercises, for example, bodybuilding

=== Other functional objects, temporarily attached to the body ===
- Capes
- Goggles
- Hair ornaments
- Hats and caps
- Headdresses
- Headphones/handsfree phone headset
- Jewelry
- Masks
- Prosthetic limbs
- Sunglasses
- Watches

== See also ==
- Beauty
- Biometrics
- Body image
- Deformity
- Dress code
- Eigenface
- Face perception
- Facial symmetry
- Fashion
- Female body shape
- Hairstyle
- Human variability
- Human body
- Hair coloring
- Nudity
- Sexual attraction
- Sexual capital
- Sexual selection
- Somatotype
- Vanity
