= Penis extender =

Device for Peyronie's disease and penis enlargement therapy

A penis extender is an external medical device with tentative evidence as of 2019 for Peyronie's disease. It acts as a mechanical, traction device that stretches the human penis in the flaccid state to make it longer.

== Description ==
Penis extenders usually have a plastic ring that sits at the base of a flaccid penis, and another ring before the glans penis, with a traction device that runs along the sides of the organ. The wearer adjusts springs, which pull the penile shaft with the intention of stretching the flaccid penis to become longer.

== Medical use ==
There is tentative evidence for use in Peyronie's disease. As of 2019, studies have been small in size; many had difficulty carrying out the treatment during the study period, and people were not blinded to the treatment that they were receiving.

== Adverse effects ==
Adverse effects are not extensively reported in the literature, and they are usually mild and self-limiting, in part caused by lack of patient compliance with penile traction therapy (PTT). The most commonly reported symptoms with PTT include pain, erythema, ecchymoses, and pruritus. Another reported symptom was edema to the pubic bone, which is associated with vigorous usage. All of these adverse events are generally self-limited and resolve with discontinuation of PTT.

It should not be used if penile wounds, lacerations, or infected zones have not fully healed, and by those suffering certain diseases or disorders. Aggressive or incorrect uses of penis extenders can cause damage to skin and blood vessels, among other possible issues.

== See also ==
- Body dysmorphic disorder
- Erectile dysfunction
- Erection
- Human penis size
- Micropenis
- Penile dysmorphic disorder
- Penis enlargement

== Bibliography ==
- Chung E, Brock G (February 2013). "Penile traction therapy and Peyronie's disease: a state of art review of the current literature". Therapeutic Advances in Urology. 5 (1). SAGE Publications: 59–65. doi:10.1177/1756287212454932. PMC 3547530. PMID 23372611.
- Valenzuela R, Ziegelmann M, Tokar S, Hillelsohn J (19 March 2019). "The use of penile traction therapy in the management of Peyronie's disease: current evidence and future prospects". Therapeutic Advances in Urology. 11 1756287219838139. SAGE Publications. doi:10.1177/1756287219838139. PMC 6444402. PMID 30956689.
