= Human variability =

Range of possible values for any characteristic of human beings

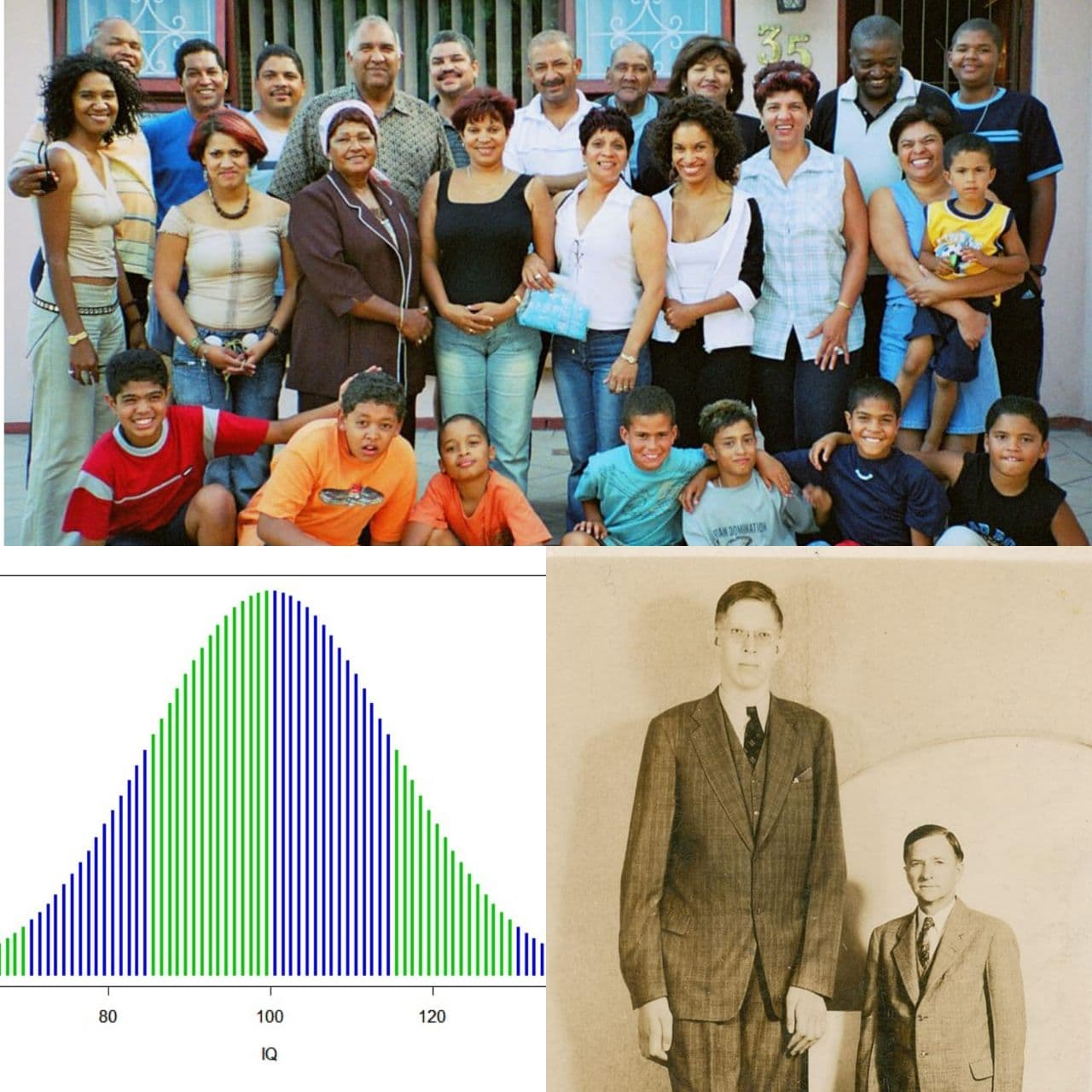
Examples of human phenotypic variability: people with different levels of skin colors, a normal distribution of IQ scores, the tallest recorded man in history – Robert Wadlow – with his father

Human variability, or human variation, is the range of possible values for any characteristic, physical or mental, of human beings.

Frequently debated areas of variability include cognitive ability, personality, physical appearance (body shape, skin color, etc.) and immunology. Variability is partly heritable and partly acquired (nature vs. nurture debate). As the human species exhibits sexual dimorphism, many traits show significant variation not just between populations but also between the sexes.

== Sources of human variability ==
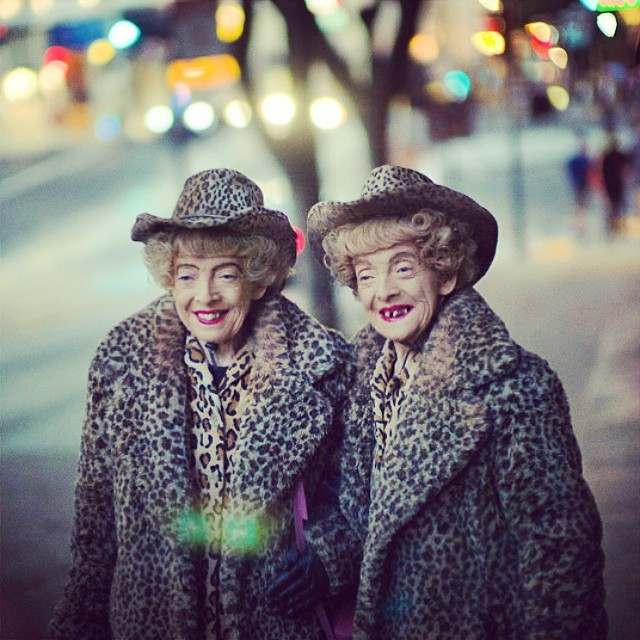
Identical twins share identical genes. They are often studied to see how environmental factors impact human variability, for example, height difference.

Human variability is attributed to a combination of environmental and genetic sources including:

- Environmental sources
  - Prenatal environment
  - Nutrition and malnutrition
  - Quality of life and health care
  - Pollution and toxin exposure and other stressors
  - Education
  - Culture
  - Climate
  - Family environment and upbringing (especially before age 5)
    - Child abuse and neglect
  - Accidents
    - Accidental, industrial or intentional injury, mutilation, or change of the body
- Genetic sources
  - Mutations
    - Gene mutation
    - Chromosomal mutation
    - External influences
  - Sexual reproduction
    - Recombination
      - Blood types/immune types
      - Allelic differences
    - Mate selection
    - Reproductive capabilities
  - Epigenetics
  - Gene flow

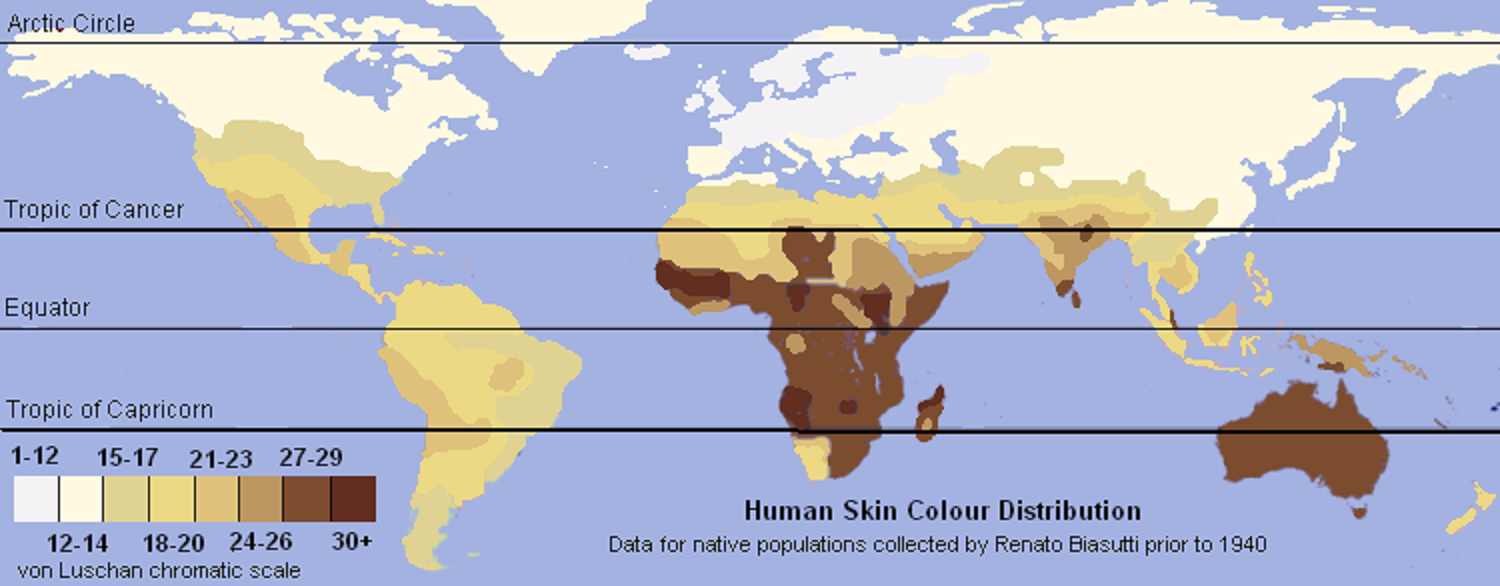
A skin color map of the world from data collected on native populations prior to 1940, based on the von Luschan chromatic scale

For the genetic variables listed above, few of the traits characterizing human variability are controlled by simple Mendelian inheritance. Most are polygenic or are determined by a complex combination of genetics and environment.

Many genetic differences (polymorphisms) have little effect on health or reproductive success but help to distinguish one population from another. It is helpful for researchers in the field of population genetics to study ancient migrations and relationships between population groups.

=== Environmental factors ===
==== Climate and disease ====
Other important factors of environmental factors include climate and disease. Climate has effects on determining what kinds of human variation are more adaptable to survive without much restrictions and hardships. For example, people who live in a climate where there is a lot of exposure to sunlight have a darker color of skin tone. Evolution has caused production of folate (folic acid) from UV radiation, thus giving them darker skin tone with more melanin to make sure child development is smooth and successful. Conversely, people who live farther away from the equator have a lighter skin tone. This is due to a need for an increased exposure and absorbance of sunlight to make sure the body can produce enough vitamin D for survival.

Blackfoot disease is a disease caused by environmental pollution and causes people to have black, charcoal-like skin in the lower limbs. This is caused by arsenic pollution in water and food source. This is an example of how disease can affect human variation. Another disease that can affect human variation is syphilis, a sexual transmitted disease. Syphilis does not affect human variation until the middle stage of the disease. It then starts to grow rashes all over the body, affecting people's human variation.

==== Nutrition ====
Phenotypic variation is a combination of one's genetics and their surrounding environment, with no interaction or mutual influence between the two. This means that a significant portion of human variability can be controlled by human behavior. Nutrition and diet play a substantial role in determining phenotype because they are arguably the most controllable forms of environmental factors that create epigenetic changes. This is because they can be changed or altered relatively easily as opposed to other environmental factors like location.

If people are reluctant to changing their diets, consuming harmful foods can have chronic negative effects on variability. One such instance of this occurs when eating certain chemicals through one's diet or consuming carcinogens, which can have adverse effects on individual phenotype. For example, Bisphenol A (BPA) is a known endocrine disruptor that mimics the hormone estradiol and can be found in various plastic products. BPA seeps into food or drinks when the plastic containing it is heated up and begins to melt. When these contaminated substances are consumed, especially often and over long periods of time, one's risk of diabetes and cardiovascular disease increases. BPA also has the potential to alter "physiological weight control patterns." Examples such as this demonstrate that preserving a healthy phenotype largely rests on nutritional decision-making skills.

The concept that nutrition and diet affect phenotype extends to what the mother eats during pregnancy, which can have drastic effects on the outcome of the phenotype of the child. A recent study by researchers at the MRC International Nutrition Group shows that "methylation machinery can be disrupted by nutrient deficiencies and that this can lead to disease" susceptibility in newborn babies. The reason for this is because methyl groups have the ability to silence certain genes. Increased deficiencies of various nutrients such as this have the potential to permanently change the epigenetics of the baby.

=== Genetic factors ===
Genetic variation in humans may mean any variance in phenotype which results from heritable allele expression, mutations, and epigenetic changes. While human phenotypes may seem diverse, individuals actually differ by only 1 in every 1,000 base pairs and is primarily the result of inherited genetic differences. Pure consideration of alleles is often referred to as Mendelian Genetics, or more properly Classical Genetics, and involves the assessment of whether a given trait is dominant or recessive and thus, at what rates it will be inherited. The color of one's eyes was long believed to occur with a pattern of brown-eye dominance, with blue eyes being a recessive characteristic resulting from a past mutation. However, it is now understood that eye color is controlled by various genes, and thus, may not follow as distinct a pattern as previously believed. The trait is still the result of variance in genetic sequence between individuals as a result of inheritance from their parents. Common traits which may be linked to genetic patterns are earlobe attachment, hair color, and hair growth patterns.

In terms of evolution, genetic mutations are the origins of differences in alleles between individuals. However, mutations may also occur within a person's life-time and be passed down from parent to offspring. In some cases, mutations may result in genetic diseases, such as Cystic Fibrosis, which is the result of a mutation to the CFTR gene that is recessively inherited from both parents. In other cases, mutations may be harmless or phenotypically unnoticeable. We are able to treat biological traits as manifestations of either a single loci or multiple loci, labeling said biological traits as either monogenic or polygenic, respectively. Concerning polygenic traits it may be essential to be mindful of inter-genetic interactions or epistasis. Although epistasis is a significant genetic source of biological variation, it is only additive interactions that are heritable as other epistatic interactions involve recondite inter-genetic relationships. Epistatic interactions in of themselves vary further with their dependency on the results of the mechanisms of recombination and crossing over.

The ability of genes to be expressed may also be a source of variation between individuals and result in changes to phenotype. This may be the result of epigenetics, which are founded upon an organism's phenotypic plasticity, with such a plasticity even being heritable. Epigenetics may result from methylation of gene sequences leading to the blocking of expression or changes to histone protein structuring as a result of environmental or biological cues. Such alterations influence how genetic material is handled by the cell and to what extent certain DNA sections are expressed and compose the epigenome. The division between what can be considered as a genetic source of biological variation and not becomes immensely arbitrary as we approach aspects of biological variation such as epigenetics. Indeed, gene specific gene expression and inheritance may be reliant on environmental influences.

=== Cultural factors ===
Archaeological findings such as those that indicate that the Middle Stone Age and the Acheulean – identified as a specific 'cultural phases' of humanity with a number of characteristics – lasted substantially longer in some places or 'ended' at times over 100,000 years apart, highlight a significant spatiotemporal cultural variability in and complexity of the sociocultural history and evolution of humanity. In some cases cultural factors may be intertwined with genetic and environmental factors.

== Measuring variation ==
=== Scientific ===
Measurement of human variation can fall under the purview of several scholarly disciplines, many of which lie at the intersection of biology and statistics. The methods of biostatistics, the application of statistical methods to the analysis of biological data, and bioinformatics, the application of information technologies to the analysis of biological data, are utilized by researchers in these fields to uncover significant patterns of variability. Some fields of scientific research include the following:

Demography is a branch of statistics and sociology concerned with the statistical study of populations, especially humans. A demographic analysis can measure various metrics of a population, most commonly metrics of size and growth, diversity in culture, ethnicity, language, religious belief, political belief, etc. Biodemography is a subfield which specifically integrates biological understanding into demographics analysis.

In the social sciences, social research is conducted and collected data is analyzed under statistical methods. The methodologies of this research can be divided into qualitative and quantitative designs. Some example subdisciplines include:

- Anthropology, the study of human societies. Comparative research in subfields of anthropology may yield results on human variation with respect to the subfield's topic of interest.
- Psychology, the study of behavior from a mental perspective. Does a lot of experiments and analysis grouped into quantitative or qualitative research methods.
- Sociology, the study of behavior from a social perspective. Sociological research can be conducted in either quantitative or qualitative formats, depending on the nature of data collected and the subfield of sociology under which the research falls. Analysis of this data is subject to quantitative or qualitative methods. Computational sociology is also a method of producing useful data for studies of social behavior.

=== Anthropometry ===
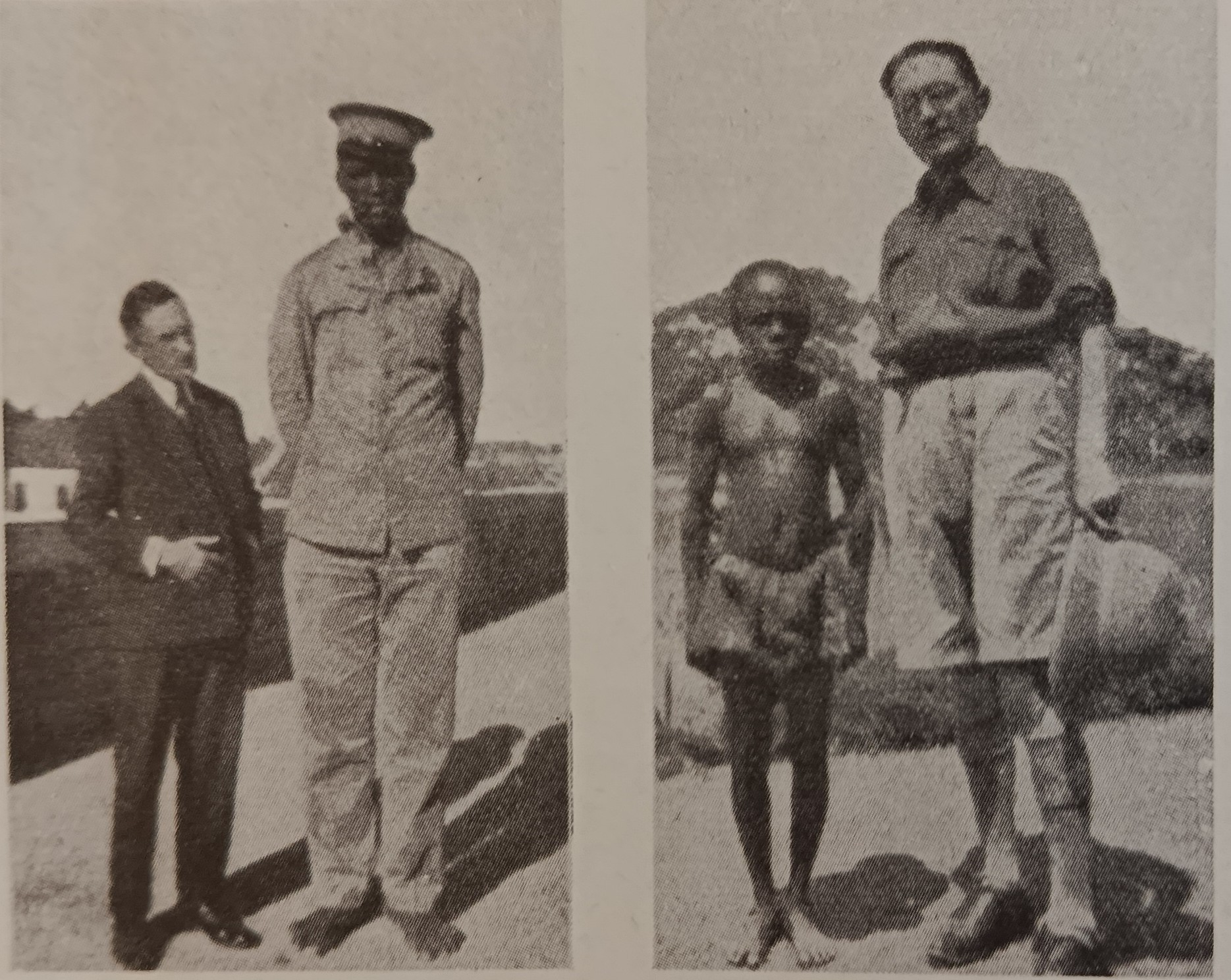
Italian anthropologist Lidio Cipriani comparing his own height with men from two different ethnic backgrounds: anthropologists tried to understand human height variation between different human groups.

Anthropometry is the study of the measurements of different parts of the human body. Common measurements include height, weight, organ size (brain, stomach, penis, vagina), and other bodily metrics such as waist–hip ratio. Each measurement can vary significantly between populations; for instance, the average height of males of European descent is 178 cm ± 7 cm and of females of European descent is 165 cm ± 7 cm. Meanwhile, average height of Nilotic males in Dinka is 181.3 cm.

Applications of anthropometry include ergonomics, biometrics, and forensics. Knowing the distribution of body measurements enable designers to build better tools for workers. Anthropometry is also used when designing safety equipment such as seat belts. In biometrics, measurements of fingerprints and iris patterns can be used for secure identification purposes.

=== Measuring genetic variation ===
Human genomics and population genetics are the study of the human genome and variome, respectively. Studies in these areas may concern the patterns and trends in human DNA. The Human Genome Project and The Human Variome Project are examples of large-scale studies of the entire human population to collect data which can be analyzed to understand genomic and genetic variation in individuals, respectively.

- The Human Genome Project is the largest scientific project in the history of biology. At a cost of $3.8 billion in funding and over a period of 13 years from 1990 to 2003, the project processed through DNA sequencing the approximately three billion base pairs and catalogued the 20,000 to 25,000 genes in human DNA. The project made the data available to all scientific researchers and developed analytical tools for processing this information. A particular finding regarding human variability due to difference in DNA made possible by the Human Genome Project is that any two individuals share 99.9% of their nucleotide sequences.
- The Human Variome Project is a similar undertaking with the goal of identification and categorization of the set of human genetic variation, specifically variations which are medically pertinent. This project will also provide a data repository for further research and analysis of disease. The Human Variome Project was launched in 2006 and is being run by an international community of researchers and representatives, including collaborators from the World Health Organization and the United Nations Educational, Scientific, and Cultural Organization.

==== Genetic drift ====
Genetic drift is one method by which variability occurs in populations. Unlike natural selection, genetic drift occurs when alleles decrease randomly over time and not as a result of selection bias. Over a long history, this can cause significant shifts in the underlying genetic distribution of a population. We can model genetic drift with the Wright-Fisher model. In a population of N with 2N genes, there are two alleles with frequencies p and q. If the previous generation had an allele with frequency p, then the probability that the next generation has k of that allele is:

${2N \choose k} p^k q^{2N-k}$

Over time, one allele will be fixed when the frequency of that allele reaches 1 and the frequency of the other allele reaches 0. The probability that any allele is fixed is proportional to the frequency of that allele. For two alleles with frequencies p and q, the probability that p will be fixed is p. The expected number of generations for an allele with frequency p to be fixed is:

$\bar{T}_\text{fixed} = \frac{-4N_e(1-p) \ln (1-p)}{p}$

Where N_{e} is the effective population size.

==== Single-nucleotide polymorphism ====
Single-nucleotide polymorphism or SNPs are variations of a single nucleotide. SNPs can occur in coding or non-coding regions of genes and on average occur once every 300 nucleotides. SNPs in coding regions can cause synonymous, missense, and nonsense mutations. SNPs have shown to be correlated with drug responses and risk of diseases such as sickle-cell anemia, Alzheimer's disease, cystic fibrosis, and more.

==== DNA fingerprinting ====
DNA profiling, whereby a DNA fingerprint is constructed by extracting a DNA sample from body tissue or fluid. Then, it is segmented using restriction enzymes and each segment marked with probes then exposed on X-ray film. The segments form patterns of black bars;the DNA fingerprint. DNA Fingerprints are used in conjunction with other methods in order to individuals information in Federal programs such as CODIS (Combined DNA Index System for Missing Persons) in order to help identify individuals

==== Mitochondrial DNA ====
Mitochondrial DNA, which is only passed from mother to child. The first human population studies based on mitochondrial DNA were performed by restriction enzyme analyses (RFLPs) and revealed differences between the four ethnic groups (Caucasian, Amerindian, African, and Asian). Differences in mtDNA patterns have also been shown in communities with a different geographic origin within the same ethnic group

==== Alloenzymic variation ====
Alloenzymic variation, a source of variation that identifies protein variants of the same gene due to amino acid substitutions in proteins. After grinding tissue to release the cytoplasm, wicks are used to absorb the resulting extract and placed in a slit cut into a starch gel. A low current is run across the gel resulting in a positive and negative ends. Proteins are then separated by charge and size, with the smaller and more highly charged molecules moving more quickly across the gel. This techniques does underestimate true genetic variability as there may be an amino acid substitution but if the amino acid is not charged differently than the original no difference in migration will appear it is estimated that approximately 1/3 of the true genetic variation is not expressed by this technique.

==== Structural variation ====
Structural variation, which can include insertions, deletions, duplications, and mutations in DNA. Within the human population, about 13% of the human genome is defined as structurally variant.

==== Phenotypic variation ====
Phenotypic variation, which accounts for both genetic and epigenetic factors that affect what characteristics are shown. For applications such as organ donations and matching, phenotypic variation of blood type, tissue type, and organ size are considered.

== Civic ==
Measurement of human variation may also be initiated by governmental parties. A government may conduct a census, the systematic recording of an entire population of a region. The data may be used for calculating metrics of demography such as sex, gender, age, education, employment, etc.; this information is utilized for civic, political, economic, industrial, and environmental assessment and planning.

== Commercial ==
Commercial motivation for understanding variation in human populations arises from the competitive advantage of tailoring products and services for a specific target market. A business may undertake some form of market research in order to collect data on customer preference and behavior and implement changes which align with the results.

== Social significance and valuation ==
Both individuals and entire societies and cultures place values on different aspects of human variability; however, values can change as societies and cultures change. Not all people agree on the values or relative rankings, and neither do all societies and cultures. Nonetheless, nearly all human differences have a social value dimension. Examples of variations which may be given different values in different societies include skin color and/or body structure. Race and sex have a strong value difference, while handedness has a much weaker value difference. The values given to different traits among human variability are often influenced by what phenotypes are more prevalent locally. Local valuation may affect social standing, reproductive opportunities, or even survival.

Differences may vary or be distributed in various ways. Some, like height for a given sex, vary in close to a "normal" or Gaussian distribution. Other characteristics (e.g., skin color) vary continuously in a population, but the continuum may be socially divided into a small number of distinct categories. Then, there are some characteristics that vary bimodally (for example, handedness), with fewer people in intermediate categories.

== Classification and evaluation of traits ==
When an inherited difference of body structure or function is severe enough to cause a significant hindrance in certain perceived abilities, it is termed a genetic disease, but even this categorization has fuzzy edges. There are many instances in which the degree of negative value of a human difference depends completely on the social or physical environment. For example, in a society with a large proportion of deaf people (as Martha's Vineyard in the 19th century), it was possible to deny that deafness is a disability. Another example of social renegotiation of the value assigned to a difference is reflected in the controversy over management of ambiguous genitalia, especially whether abnormal genital structure has enough negative consequences to warrant surgical correction.

Furthermore, many genetic traits may be advantageous in certain circumstances and disadvantageous in others. Being a heterozygote or carrier of the sickle-cell disease gene confers some protection against malaria, apparently enough to maintain the gene in populations of malarial areas. In a homozygous dose it is a significant disability.

Each trait has its own advantages and disadvantages, but sometimes a trait that is found desirable may not be favorable in terms of certain biological factors such as reproductive fitness, and traits that are not highly valued by the majority of people may be favorable in terms of biological factors. For example, women tend to have fewer pregnancies on average than before and therefore net worldwide fertility rates are dropping. Moreover, this leads to the fact that multiple births tend to be favorable in terms of number of children and therefore offspring count; when the average number of pregnancies and the average number of children was higher, multiple births made only a slight relative difference in number of children. However, with fewer pregnancies, multiple births can make the difference in number of children relatively large. A hypothetical scenario would be that couple 1 has ten children and couple 2 has eight children, but in both couples, the woman undergoes eight pregnancies. This is not a large difference in ratio of fertility. However, another hypothetical scenario can be that couple 1 has three children and couple 2 has one child but in both couples the woman undergoes one pregnancy (in this case couple 2 has triplets). When the proportion of offspring count in the latter hypothetical scenario is compared, the difference in proportion of offspring count becomes higher. A trait in women known to greatly increase the chance of multiple births is being a tall woman (presumably the chance is further increased when the woman is very tall among both women and men). Yet very tall women are not viewed as a desirable phenotype by the majority of people, and the phenotype of very tall women has not been highly favored in the past. Nevertheless, values placed on traits can change over time.

Such an example is homosexuality. In Ancient Greece, what in present terms would be called homosexuality, primarily between a man and a young boy, was not uncommon and was not outlawed. However, homosexuality became more condemned. Attitudes towards homosexuality alleviated in modern times.

== Controversies of sociocultural and personal implications ==
Possession of above average amounts of some abilities is valued by most societies. Some of the traits that societies try to measure by perception are intellectual aptitude in the form of ability to learn, artistic prowess, strength, endurance, agility, and resilience.

Each individual's distinctive differences, even the negatively valued or stigmatized ones, are usually considered an essential part of self-identity. Membership or status in a social group may depend on having specific values for certain attributes. It is not unusual for people to deliberately try to amplify or exaggerate differences, or to conceal or minimize them, for a variety of reasons. Examples of practices designed to minimize differences include tanning, hair straightening, skin bleaching, plastic surgery, orthodontia, and growth hormone treatment for extreme shortness. Conversely, male-female differences are enhanced and exaggerated in most societies.

In some societies, such as the United States, circumcision is practiced on a majority of males, as well as sex reassignment on intersex infants, with substantial emphasis on cultural and religious norms. Circumcision is highly controversial because although it offers health benefits, such as less chance of urinary tract infections, STDs, and penile cancer, it is considered a drastic procedure that is not medically mandatory and argued as a decision that should be taken when the child is old enough to decide for himself. Similarly, sex reassignment surgery offers psychiatric health benefits to transgender people but is seen as unethical by some Christians, especially when performed on children.

Much controversy surrounds the assigning or distinguishing of some variations, especially since differences between groups in a society or between societies is often debated as part of either a person's "essential" nature or a socially constructed attribution. For example, there has long been a debate among sex researchers on whether sexual orientation is due to evolution and biology (the "essentialist" position), or a result of mutually reinforcing social perceptions and behavioral choices (the "constructivist" perspective). The essentialist position emphasizes inclusive fitness as the reason homosexuality has not been eradicated by natural selection. Gay or lesbian individuals have not been greatly affected by evolutionary selection because they may help the fitness of their siblings and siblings' children, thus increasing their own fitness through inclusive fitness and maintaining evolution of homosexuality. Biological theories for same-gender sexual orientation include genetic influences, neuroanatomical factors, and hormone differences but research so far has not provided any conclusive results. In contrast, the social constructivist position argues that sexuality is a result of culture and has originated from language or dialogue about sex. Mating choices are the product of cultural values, such as youth and attractiveness, and homosexuality varies greatly between cultures and societies. In this view, complexities, such as sexual orientation changing during the course of one's lifespan, are accounted for.

Controversy also surrounds the boundaries of "wellness", "wholeness," or "normality." In some cultures, differences in physical appearance, mental ability, and even sex can exclude one from traditions, ceremonies, or other important events, such as religious service. For example, in India, menstruation is not only a taboo subject but also traditionally considered shameful. Depending on beliefs, a woman who is menstruating is not allowed to cook or enter spiritual areas because she is "impure" and "cursed". There has been large-scale renegotiation of the social significance of variations which reduce the ability of a person to do one or more functions in western culture. Laws have been passed to alleviate the reduction of social opportunity available to those with disabilities. The concept of "differently abled" has been pushed by those persuading society to see limited incapacities as a human difference of less negative value.

== Ideologies of superiority and inferiority ==
The extreme exercise of social valuation of human difference is in the definition of "human." Differences between humans can lead to an individual's "nonhuman" status, in the sense of withholding identification, charity, and social participation. Views of these variations can change enormously between cultures over time. For example, nineteenth-century European and American ideas of race and eugenics culminated in the attempts of the Nazi-led German society of the 1930s to deny not just reproduction, but life itself to a variety of people with "differences" attributed in part to biological characteristics. Hitler and Nazi leaders wanted to create a "master race" consisting of only Aryans, or blue-eyed, blonde-haired, and tall individuals, thus discriminating and attempting to exterminate those who didn't fit into this ideal.

Contemporary controversy continues over "what kind of human" is a fetus or child with a significant disability. On one end are people who would argue that Down syndrome is not a disability but a mere "difference," and on the other those who consider it such a calamity as to assume that such a child is better off "not born". For example, in India and China, being female is widely considered such a negatively valued human difference that female infanticide occurs such to severely affect the proportion of sexes.

== Common human variations ==
Human Genetic Variation
Type of Variation	Example
Sex	Klinefelter syndrome Turner syndrome Female Male
Skin Color	Human skin color Albinism
Eye Color	Eye color Martin scale
Hair Color	Human hair color Hair coloring
Hair Quantity	Hair loss Hirsutism
Extra Body Parts	Polydactyly Supernumerary body part
Missing Body Parts	Amelia (birth defect) Amniotic band constriction
Recessive Phenotypes	Cleft lip and cleft palate Earlobe

Physical Disabilities
Type of Variation	Example
Amputation	Amputation
Blindness	Color blindness Visual impairment
Deafness	Tone deafness Hearing loss
Muteness	Muteness Selective Mutism
Genetic/Longterm Diseases	Sickle-cell disease Trisomy 21

Reproductive Abilities
Type of Variation	Example
Fertility	Infertility Natural fertility
Fecundity	Fecundity selection Sterility Birth rate

Other Aspects of Human Physical Appearance
Type of Variation	Example
Acquire Variability	Tattoo Plastic surgery
Body Weight	Obesity Anorexia nervosa

Human Development
Type of Variation	Example
Age	Menopause Puberty Childhood
Developmental Disorders	Progeroid syndromes Werner syndrome

Psychological and Personality Traits
Type of Variation	Example
Temperament	Extraversion and introversion Big Five personality traits
Creative Ability	Dexterity Creativity

== See also ==
- Anthropometry
- Human genetic variation
- Human physical appearance
- Mendelian traits in humans
- Quantitative trait locus
- Human behaviour genetics
- Big Five personality traits
