= Penis enlargement =

Technique aimed to increase the size of a human penis

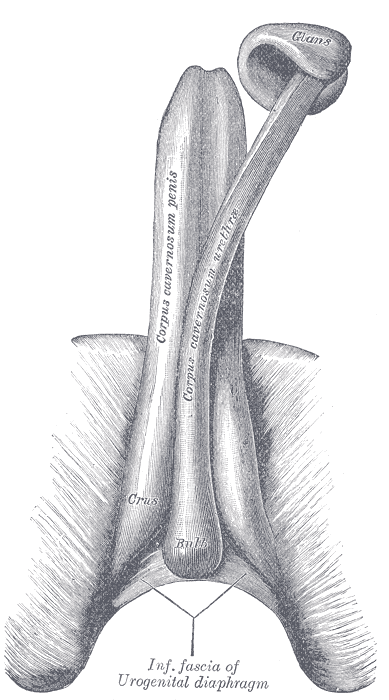
Penile enlargement procedures are designed to increase the size of the cavernous cylinders of the penis or to stimulate blood flow to increase hardness.

Penis enlargement, or male enhancement, is any technique aimed to increase the size of a human penis. Some methods aim to increase total length, others the shaft's girth, and yet others the glans and foreskin size. Techniques include surgery, supplements, ointments, patches, and physical methods like pumping, jelqing, and traction.

Surgical penis enlargement methods can be effective; however, such methods carry risks of complications and are not medically indicated except in cases involving a micropenis. Non-invasive methods have received little scientific study, and most lack scientific evidence of effectiveness. However, limited scientific evidence supports some elongation by prolonged traction. Some quack products may improve penis erection, mistaken by consumers for penis enlargement.

== Surgical methods ==
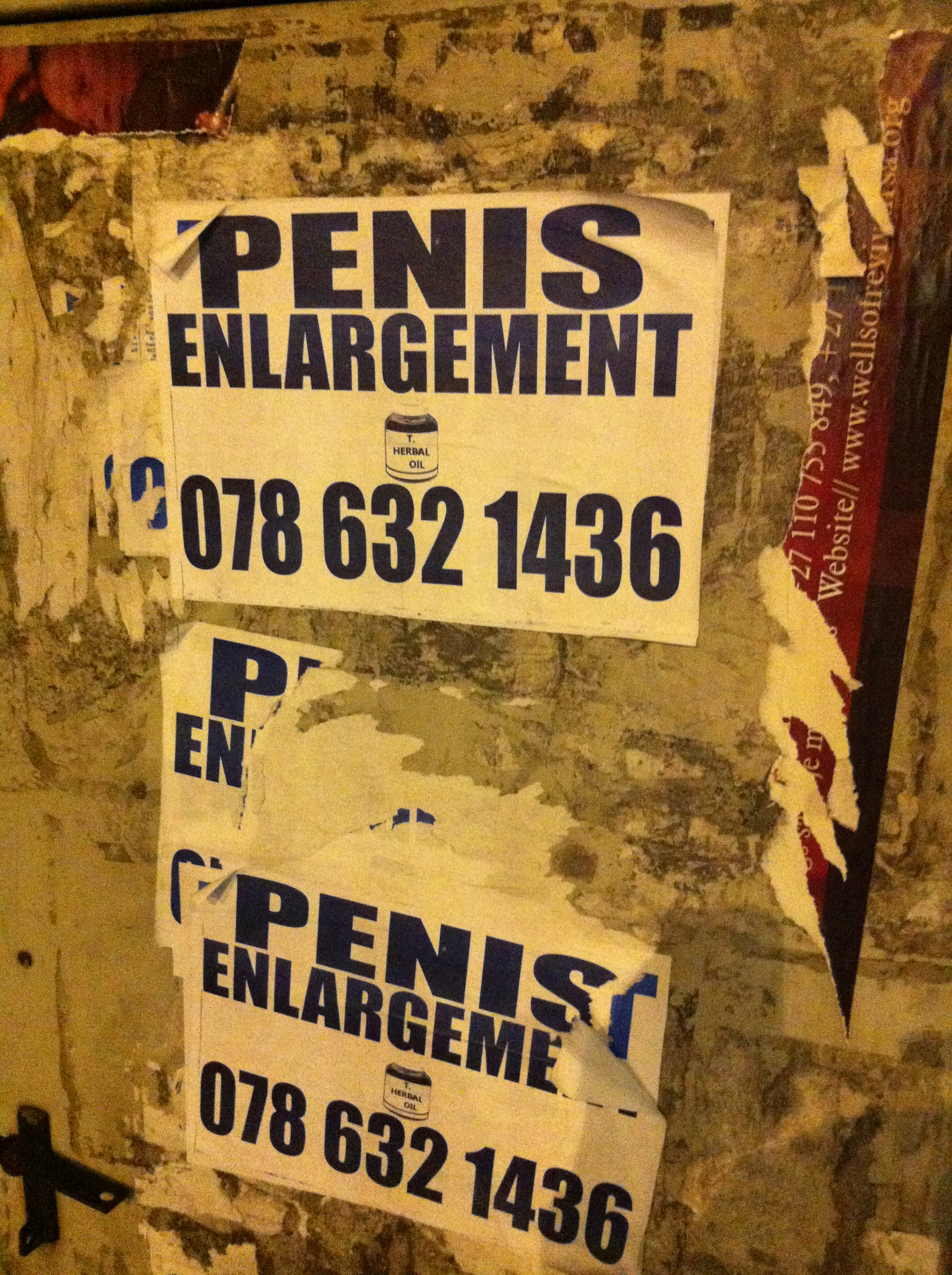
Penis enlargement advertisements in Johannesburg.

There are several surgical penis enlargement treatments, most of which carry a risk of significant complications. Procedures by unlicensed surgeons can lead to serious complications.

Surgical penis enlargement methods include penile augmentation and suspensory ligament release. Penile augmentation involves injecting fat cells into the penis or grafting fat cells onto the penis. Injecting fat cells into the penis can cause swelling and deformity; in some instances, removal of the penis may be necessary. Grafting fat cells onto the penis can be effective; however, the increase in size may disappear over time. Suspensory ligament release increases flaccid penis length, but does not increase the length of an erect penis and can create problems with sexual function.

The American Urological Association (AUA) and the Urology Care Foundation "consider subcutaneous fat injection for increasing penile girth to be a procedure which has not been shown to be safe or efficacious. The AUA also considers the division of the suspensory ligament of the penis for increasing penile length in adults to be a procedure which has not been shown to be safe or efficacious." Both statements were first published in January 1994 and re-affirmed ever since. Complications from penis enlargement procedures include scarring that may lead, ultimately, to penis shrinkage or erectile dysfunction.

Other surgical treatments include the injection of dermal fillers, silicone gel, or PMMA. Dermal fillers are also not approved by the US Food and Drug Administration (FDA) for use in the penis. Injectables such as hyaluronic acid and polyactic acid have shown some limited efficacy, however the Sexual Medicine Society of North America (SMSNA) "strongly recommends against" permanent fillers such as paraffins and silicone.

Because of great risk and uncertainty, medical professionals are generally skeptical of penile enlargement and avoid attempting it. A 2019 study in Sexual Medicine Reviews found that surgical methods of penis enlargement are typically ineffective and can be damaging to both physical and mental health. The authors found that such treatments are "'supported by scant, low-quality evidence... Injectables and surgery should remain a last option, considered unethical outside of clinical trials'". According to the study, "'overall treatment outcomes were poor, with low satisfaction rates and significant risk of major complications, including penile deformity, shortening, and erectile dysfunction'".

Medical doctors do treat micropenis with surgical procedures. In such cases, surgery can improve urinary or sexual function.

== Supplements ==
Penis-enlargement pills, patches, and ointments are sold online. These products are generally considered ineffective.

== Physical techniques ==
Physical techniques involve extension devices, hanging weights, and vacuum pressure. There is also significant overlap between techniques intended to enlarge the penis and techniques intended to achieve other, related objectives, such as reversing impotence, extending the duration of erections, or enhancing sexual climax.

=== Pumping ===
Commonly called a "penis pump", a vacuum erection device, or VED, creates negative pressure that expands and thereby draws blood into the penis. Medically approved VEDs, which treat erectile dysfunction, limit maximum pressure, whereas the pumps commonly bought by consumers seeking penis enlargement can reach dangerous pressure, damaging penis tissue. To retain tumescence after breaking the device's airtight seal, one must constrict the penis' base, but constriction worn over 30 minutes can permanently damage the penis and cause erectile dysfunction. Although vacuum therapy can treat erectile dysfunction sufficiently to prevent penis deterioration and shrinkage, clinical trials have not found it effective for penis enlargement.

=== Jelqing ===
The latinized name "jelqing" is the corrupt form derived from the Persian jalq zadan (جلق زدن), jalq meaning "to masturbate" followed by an auxiliary verb zadan meaning "to strike, hit or throb". Performed on the semi-erect penis, jelqing is a manual manipulation of simultaneous squeezing and stroking the shaft from base to corona. Also called "milking", the technique has ancient Arab origins. Despite many anecdotal reports of success, medical evidence is absent. Journalists have dismissed the method as biologically implausible, or even impossible. Some clinicians caution against the routine use of jelqing techniques, including excessive or aggressive manipulations of the penis, due to concerns of potential fibrosis and plaque formation. Jelqing may increase the risk of developing hard flaccid syndrome, a condition characterized by a flaccid penis that remains in a firm, semi-rigid state in the absence of sexual arousal.

=== Traction ===
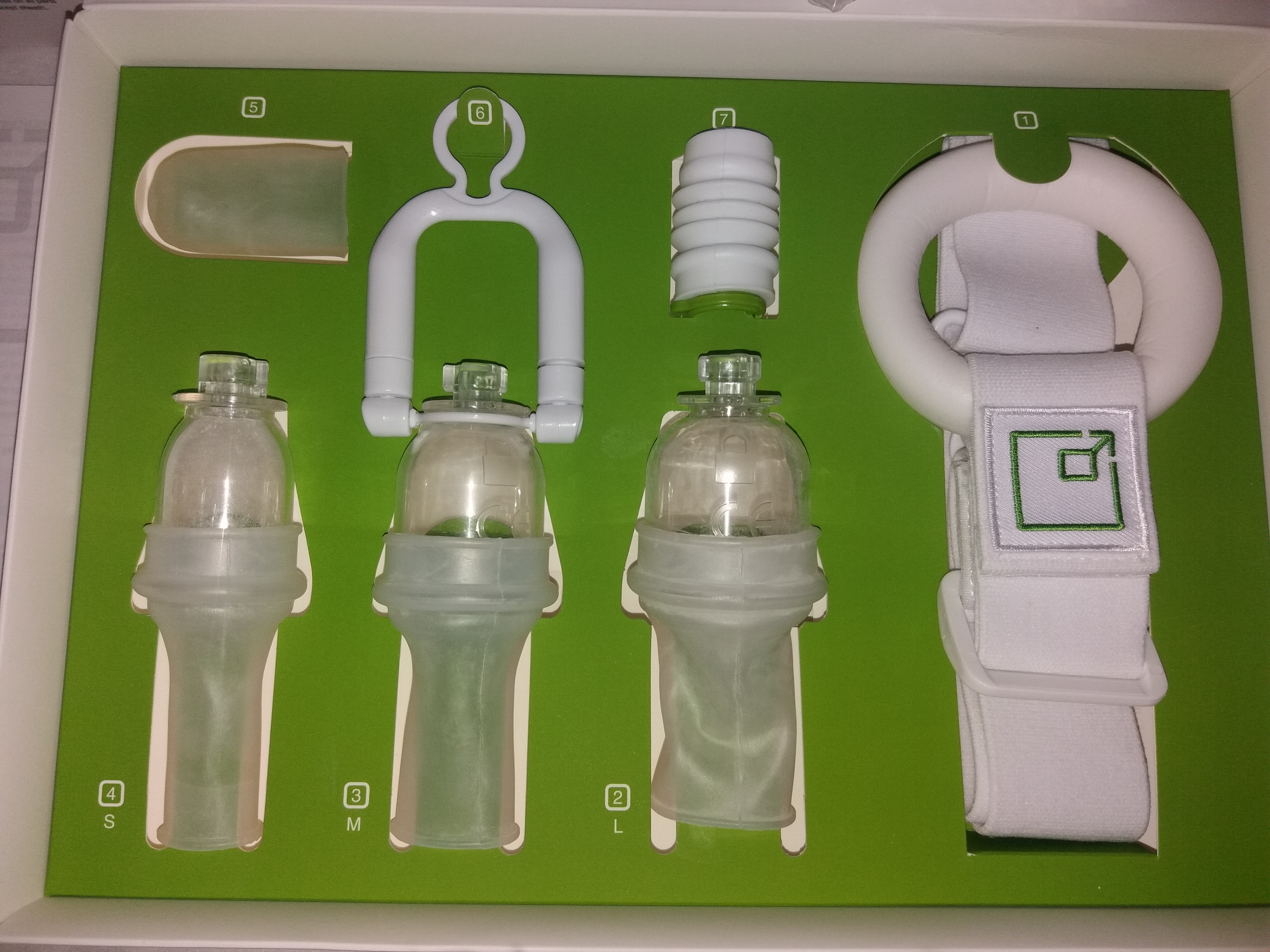
One type of traction device

Traction is a nonsurgical method to lengthen the penis by employing devices that pull at the glans of the penis for extended periods of time. As of 2013, the majority of research investigating the use of penile traction focuses on treating the curvature and shrinkage of the penis as a result of Peyronie's disease, although some literature exists on the effects on men with short penises.

Scientific evidence supports some elongation by prolonged traction. There are also medical studies that indicate that the lengthening effects can be negligible.

== Society and culture ==
Some doctors say that most men seeking penis enlargement have normal-sized penises, and many may experience penile dysmorphophobia by underestimating their own penis size while overestimating the average penis size.

Products purported to enlarge one's penis were frequently promoted via spam email in the late 1990s and early 2000s. In 2003, a log file from an e-commerce site used by one such spammer was accidentally exposed on the public Internet. It showed that they received around 6,000 orders for their herbal supplement product "Pinacle" [sic] in a period of four weeks, with most orders being for $100 worth of product. The US Federal Trade Commission said at the time that "there is no proof the pills work as advertised".

In 2013 in Vietnam, many Vietnamese men attempted to enlarge their penises by injecting liquid silicone into them. They were hospitalized for complications such as infections, necrosis, tumors, swelling, deformities, and sexual dysfunction.

== See also ==
- Body dysmorphic disorder
- Clitoral enlargement methods
- Penile dysmorphic disorder
- Penis reduction
- Peyronie's disease
- Plastic surgery
- Tissue expansion
