= Penile dysmorphic disorder =

Body dysmorphic disorder focused on the penis

Penile dysmorphic disorder, sometimes abbreviated as PDD, is a manifestation of body dysmorphic disorder where the main bodily area of fixation is the size, shape, or appearance of the penis. PDD on its own is not a recognized disorder, and there are no clinical standards to diagnose it in patients.

Individuals with PDD typically develop heightened anxiety, shame, or dissatisfaction about their penis size or shape, even when their measurements fall within the average size. This distorted perception may tamper with daily functioning, relationships, and sexual life. Although PDD is not formally classified as a distinct diagnosis, it has become more and more prominent in clinical studies and discussions around male body image.

The condition is associated with what is sometimes referred to as small penis anxiety (SPA), but is thought to have a more acute psychological impact. While individuals with SPA may express concerns about their genital appearance, those with PDD typically meet the full criteria for BDD, including repetitive actions such as mirror checking, measuring, or comparing.

Unlike micropenis, which is defined medically as a penis that is more than 2.5 standard deviations below the average size, PDD occurs in individuals whose genital size falls within the normal range. This term is primarily used to differentiate between general discontent and pathological concern in clinical and research settings.

== Signs and symptoms ==
Individuals with PDD suffer from ceaseless and intrusive thoughts about the size, shape, or appearance of their penis, even when it is considered to be in the normal anatomical category. These concerns lead to excessive distress, low self-esteem, shame, and social phobia. Men with PDD often engage in compulsive behaviors, such as constant mirror checking, measuring, comparing themselves to others, or researching other enlargement procedures.

The fixation can meddle with daily functioning and reduce quality of life. Recent research shows that individuals will go out of their way to avoid shame-provoking situations such as refusing to use communal spaces like changing rooms and adjusting their posture to hide the outline of their penis. Some individuals may even withdraw from dating or sexual activity entirely due to embarrassment or fear of judgment, despite research showcasing that women do not believe that a small penis is ineffective or that a larger penis is better. It has been indicated that men with PDD are more likely to have erectile dysfunction and less satisfaction with intercourse.

In clinical studies, men with PDD report symptoms similar to those with body dysmorphic disorder, such as intense self-consciousness, frequent reassurance-seeking, and misperceptions about how others view them.

== Causes and risk factors ==
The causes of PDD are likely to encompass an amalgamation of personal experiences and sociocultural influences. Men who develop body dysmorphic disorder concerning penis size often report a history of physical, emotional, or sexual abuse, perceived teasing about their competency or general appearance, specific perceived teasing about their penis size, and medical or surgical intervention to the genitalia. Exposure to pornographic media that perpetuates unrealistic standards of penis size and sexual performance may also engender the formation of such obsession. Furthermore, psychological factors such as low self-esteem, body image dissatisfaction, and perfectionism are prevalent among those affected.

Broader cultural ideals around masculinity and virility may further exacerbate beliefs that genital size is directly related to a man's worth, attractiveness, or dominance. These societal expectations can amplify feelings of inadequacy, even when one's physical characteristics fall within the typical range.

== Diagnosis ==
Penile dysmorphic disorder (PDD) is not acknowledged as a distinct diagnostic category in the Diagnostic and Statistical Manual of Mental Disorder (DSM-5), but individuals with this condition often meet criteria for body dysmorphic disorder (BDD). Diagnosis typically entails a structured clinical interview, such as the SCID (Structured Clinical Interview for DSM), to evaluate the presence of persistent occupation and functional impairment.

A validated tool specifically designed to screen for this condition is the Cosmetic Procedure Screening Scale for Penile Dysmorphic Disorder (COPS-P), which assesses levels of distress, safety behaviors, and avoidance related to penis size. PDD differs from general body dissatisfaction in its intensity, chronicity, and interference with daily life.

== Treatment and management ==
Penile dysmorphic disorder is often managed through the same clinical approaches used for body dysmorphic disorder, with psychological therapy serving as the initial line of treatment. Cognitive-behavioral therapy (CBT), which targets compulsive habits and detrimental beliefs about body image, is commonly recommended. To lessen anxiety and obsessive thinking, selective serotonin reuptake inhibitors (SSRIs) may be prescribed.

Prior to pursuing any cosmetic treatments, a psychiatric examination is necessary. Men with PDD frequently seek out penile augmentation procedures, including non-surgical and surgical techniques like jelqing, vacuum pumps, or extenders. However, the risks are high, especially for surgery, and satisfaction rates are often low. Unless BDD has been ruled out, professional bodies advise doing phalloplasty or comparable procedures with extreme caution.

== See also ==
- Body dysmorphic disorder
- Koro (disease)
