= Penis reduction =

Efforts to decrease the girth or length of the human penis

- Specialty: Urology

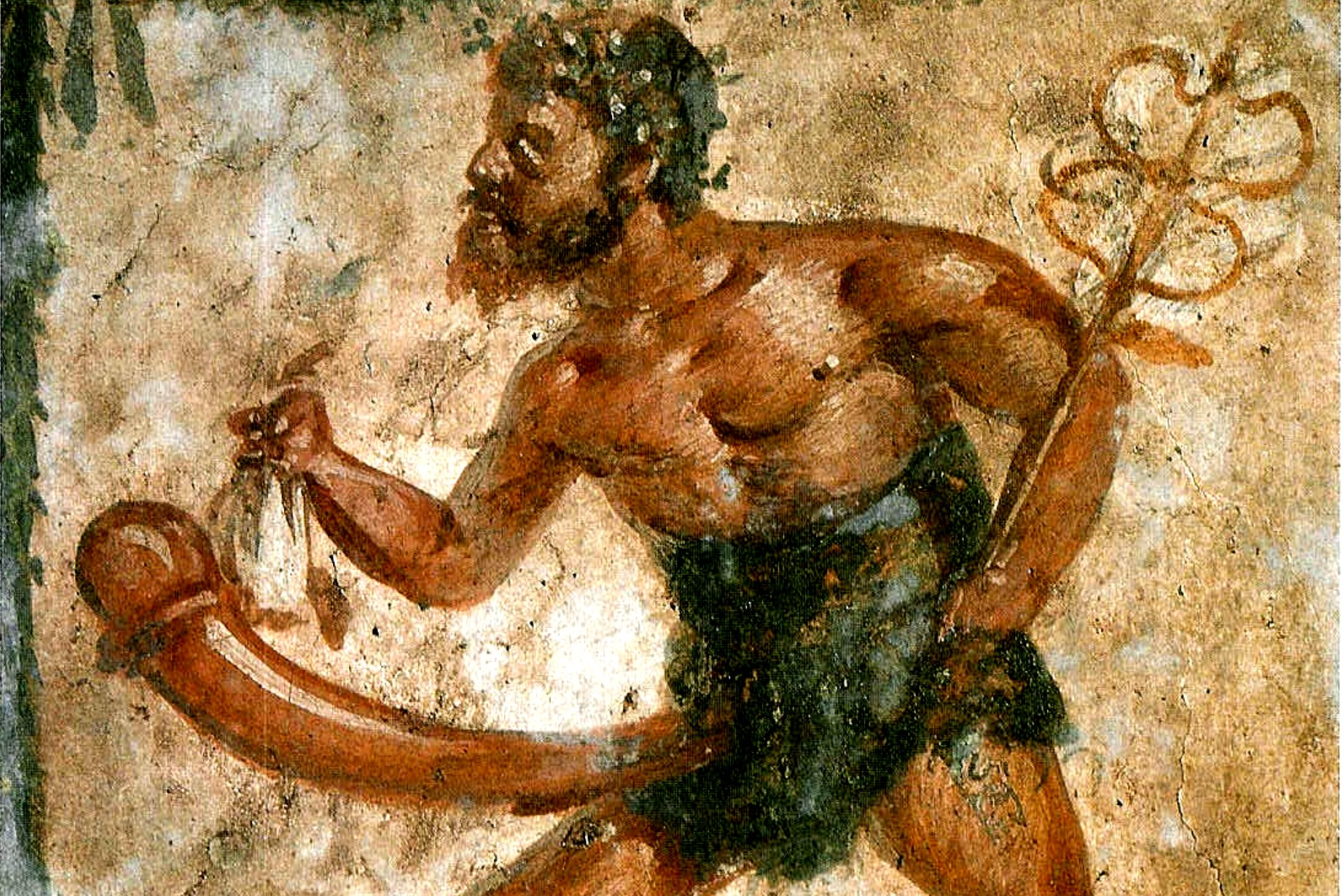
"Priapus with Caduceus"/ "Well-endowed Mercury", Anonymous fresco in Pompeii, between 89 BC and 79 AD. Museo Archeologico Nazionale (Naples), Italy

Penis reduction or penis reduction surgery refers to efforts or an assortment of techniques intended to decrease the girth or length of the human penis, especially when erect. The motive behind such a procedure can range from complications such as macropenis, genital lymphedema, or sex reassignment. It may also be motivated by the shape or size of the extant penis being unviable for intercourse and the associated social liabilities of having macrophallic penile dimensions.

The causes of macrophallism can range from sickle cell disease to priapism. The age range of individuals who have undergone treatment or are purported to have considered it vary including a 17-year-old, a 52-year-old, and a 20-year-old. The procedure may involve the removal of tissue beneath the skin of the penis, amelioration through simple excision procedures, or antihypertensive medication.

Size reduction procedures have been considered by men with partners who have complained about discomfort of thrusts against the cervix as well as those seeking additional stimulation of the clitoris.

In some ancient periods of history, the diminution of penile size was a desired appearance aesthetically, including those observable in surviving works of art, due to an association with unpretentiousness, reticence and timidity; artists also wanted to distance themselves from erotic art's obsession with over-sized genitals.
