= Human vaginal size =

Dimensions and shape of the human vagina

The vagina within the female genitals

The dimensions and shape of human vaginas are of great importance in medicine and surgery, in addition to their relevance to sexual pleasure and childbirth; there appears to be no one way, however, to characterize the vagina's size and shape. In addition to variations from individual to individual, the size and shape of a vagina in the baseline state can vary substantially during sexual arousal and intercourse.

Carrying a baby to term, i.e. parity, is associated with a significant increase in the length of the vaginal fornix. The potential effect of parity may be the result of a stretching and elongation of the birth canal at the time of vaginal birth.

There are a number of studies that have been done into the dimensions of the human vagina, but it has not been as intensively researched as human penis size.

== Dimensions in the baseline state ==
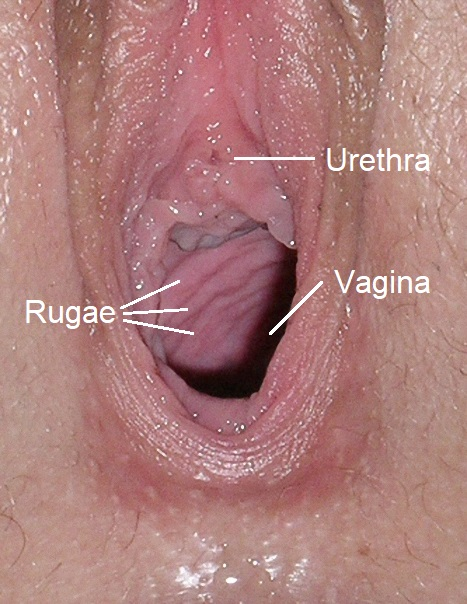
The opening to the human vagina lies just below the urethral opening at the back of the vestibule

A 1996 study by Pendergrass et al. using vinyl polysiloxane castings taken from the vaginas of 39 Caucasian women, found the following ranges of dimensions:

- lengths (measured using rods): 6.9 to 14.8 cm (2.7 to 5.8 in);
- widths: 4.8 to 6.3 cm (1.9 to 2.5 in);
- introital diameters: 2.4 to 6.5 cm (0.94 to 2.56 in)

A second study by the same group showed significant variations in size and shape between the vaginas of women of different ethnic groups. Both studies showed a wide range of vaginal shapes, described by the researchers as "Parallel sided, conical, heart, [...] slug" and "pumpkin seed" shapes. Barnhart et al., however, were not able to find any correlation amongst the race and the size of vagina. They were also unable to characterize the vaginal shape as a "heart, slug, pumpkin seed or parallel sides" as suggested by the previous studies. A 2003 study by the group of Pendergrass et al. also using castings as a measurement method, measured vaginal surface areas ranging from 66 to 107 cm^{2} (10.2 to 16.6 sq in) with a mean of 87 cm^{2} (13.5 sq in) and a standard deviation of 7.8 cm^{2} (1.21 sq in)

Research published in 2006 by Barnhart et al., gave the following mean dimensions, based on MRI scans of 28 women:

- Mean length from cervix to introitus: 6.3 cm (2.5 in).
- Mean width:
  - at the proximal vagina: 3.3 cm (1.3 in);
  - at the pelvic diaphragm: 2.7 cm (1.1 in);
  - at the introitus: 2.6 cm (1.0 in)

A 2006 U.S. study of vagina sizes using Magnetic Resonance Imaging (MRI) on 28 volunteers between 18 and 39 years old, with heights ranging from 1.5 to 1.7 metres (4 ft 11 in to 5 ft 7 in), and weights between 49.9 and 95.3 kilograms (110 and 210 lb), revealed a greater than 100 percent variation between the shortest (40.8 millimetres (1.61 in)) and the longest (95.0 millimetres (3.74 in)) vagina length.

== Medical devices ==
Given the large range in vaginal dimensions noted in studies such as the above, many fitted vaginal devices, for example pessaries, do not adhere to a "one-size-fits-all" principle.

== Sexual arousal ==
Lawrence, citing Masters and Johnson's Human Sexual Response (1966), states that pages 73 and 74 of that book show that typical vaginal depth in Masters and Johnson's participants ranged from 7–8 cm (2.8–3.1 in) in an unstimulated state, to 11–12 cm (4.3–4.7 in) during sexual arousal with a speculum in place.

== See also ==
- Human penis size
- Vaginoplasty
- Vulval structure
- Vaginal health
