= Human penis size =

Measurement of the human penis

Diagram showing how to measure the length and circumference of an erect human penis

Human penis size varies on a number of measures, including length and circumference when flaccid and erect. Besides the natural variability of human penises in general, there are factors that lead to minor variations in a particular male, such as the level of arousal, time of day, ambient temperature, anxiety level, physical activity, and frequency of sexual activity. Compared to other primates, including large examples such as the gorilla, the human penis is thickest, both in absolute terms and relative to the rest of the body. Most human penis growth occurs in two stages: the first between infancy and the age of five; and then between about one year after the onset of puberty and, at the latest, approximately 17 years of age.

Measurements vary, with studies that rely on self-measurement reporting a significantly higher average than those with a health professional measuring. A 2015 systematic review measured by health professionals rather than self-reporting, found an average erect length of 13.12 cm (5.17 in), and average erect circumference of 11.66 cm (4.59 in). A 1996 study of flaccid length found a mean of 8.8 cm (3.5 in) when measured by staff. Flaccid penis length can sometimes be a poor predictor of erect length. An adult penis that is abnormally small but otherwise normally formed is referred to in medicine as a micropenis.

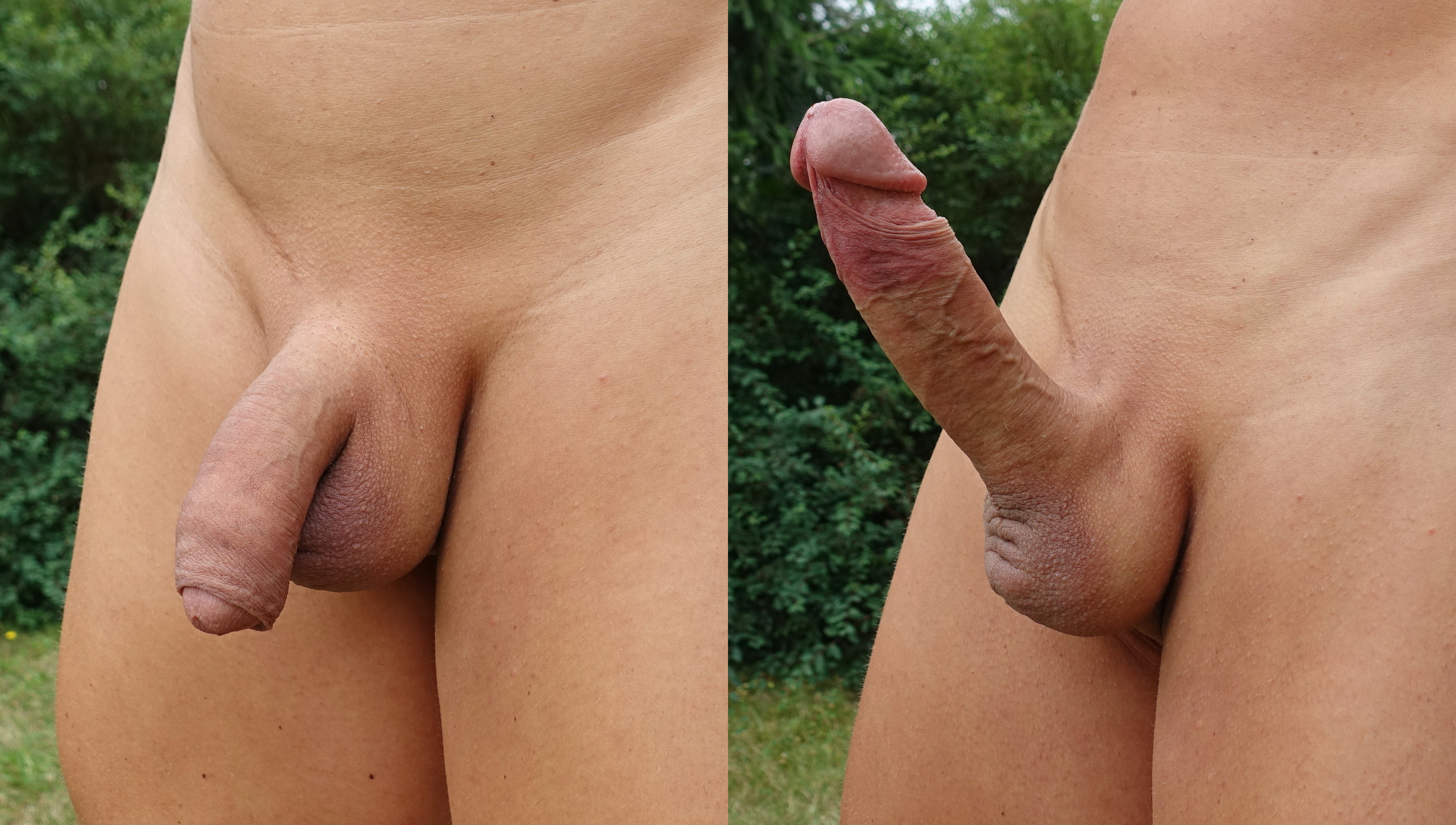
A large uncircumcised human penis, flaccid (left) and erect (right). Flaccid length is a poor predictor for erect length.

No statistically significant correlation between penis size and the size of other body parts has been found in research. Some environmental factors in addition to genetics, such as the presence of endocrine disruptors, can affect penis growth.

== Studies ==
Distribution of penis sizes by length. 45% of erect penises are between 12 and 14 cm (4.7 and 5.5 in) long.

Distribution of penis sizes by circumference. 81% of erect penises (green) are between 10 and 13 cm (3.9 and 5.1 in) in circumference.

Percentile of penile length

Percentile of penile circumference

While results vary slightly across reputable studies, the consensus is that the mean human penis, when erect, is in the range 5–6 in (13–15 cm) in length.

The 2015 review (measured by staff) found average flaccid, stretched, and erect lengths of 9.16 cm (3.61 in), 13.24 cm (5.21 in), and 13.12 cm (5.17 in), respectively, and average flaccid and erect circumferences of 9.31 cm (3.67 in) and 11.66 cm (4.59 in), respectively. Erect length in the studies was measured by pushing the pre-pubic fat pad to the bone, and flaccid or erect girth (circumference) was measured at the base or mid-shaft of the penis.

=== Measurement methods ===
Reported averages vary partly because penile size is affected by erection state, measurement technique and whether the measurement is self-reported or taken by a clinician. In clinical studies, length is commonly measured along the dorsal side from the pubic bone to the tip of the glans, with the pre-pubic fat pad compressed to the bone. Circumference is usually measured at the base or mid-shaft. Stretched flaccid length is also used in clinical assessment, although it is not identical to erect length in all men and can be affected by the amount of traction applied during measurement.

=== Length ===
==== Flaccid ====
A review of studies found average flaccid length to be 9–10 cm (3.5–3.9 in). Length of the flaccid penis does not necessarily correspond to length of the erect penis; some smaller flaccid penises grow much longer, while some larger flaccid penises grow comparatively less.

The penis and scrotum can contract involuntarily in reaction to cold temperatures, anxiety level and participation in sports. This decrease of flaccid penis size is referred to by the slang term "shrinkage", due to action by the cremaster muscle. The same phenomenon affects cyclists and exercise bike users, with prolonged pressure on the perineum from the bicycle saddle and the straining of the exercise causing the penis and scrotum to contract involuntarily. An incorrect saddle may ultimately cause erectile dysfunction. Individuals with hard flaccid syndrome or other pelvic floor disorders may temporarily have an abnormally small penis.

==== Stretched ====
Neither age nor size of the flaccid penis accurately predicts erectile length. Stretched length has correlated with erect length in some cases. However, studies have also shown drastic differences between stretched and erect length. One study found that a minimal tension force of approximately 450 g during stretching of the penis was required to reach a full potential erection length. This study also found that tension forces exerted in this study by the urologist were shown to be significantly (P<0.01) lower than 450g. This may account for differences between stretched and erect length.

- The 2015 study of 15,521 men found an average stretched flaccid length of 13.24 cm (5.21 inches), nearly identical to the average erect length of 13.12 cm (5.17 inches).
- A 2001 study of about 3,300 men found an average flaccid stretched length of 12.5 cm (4.9 in). Checking for correlations in a random subset of the sample consisting of 325 men, they found a few statistically significant Spearman's correlations: between flaccid length and height of 0.208, −0.140 with weight, and −0.238 with BMI, flaccid circumference and height 0.156, stretched length and height 0.221, weight −0.136, BMI −0.169.

==== Erect ====
Scientific studies have been performed on the erect length of the adult penis. Studies that have relied on self-measurement, including from Internet surveys, consistently reported a higher average length than those that used medical or scientific methods to obtain measurements.

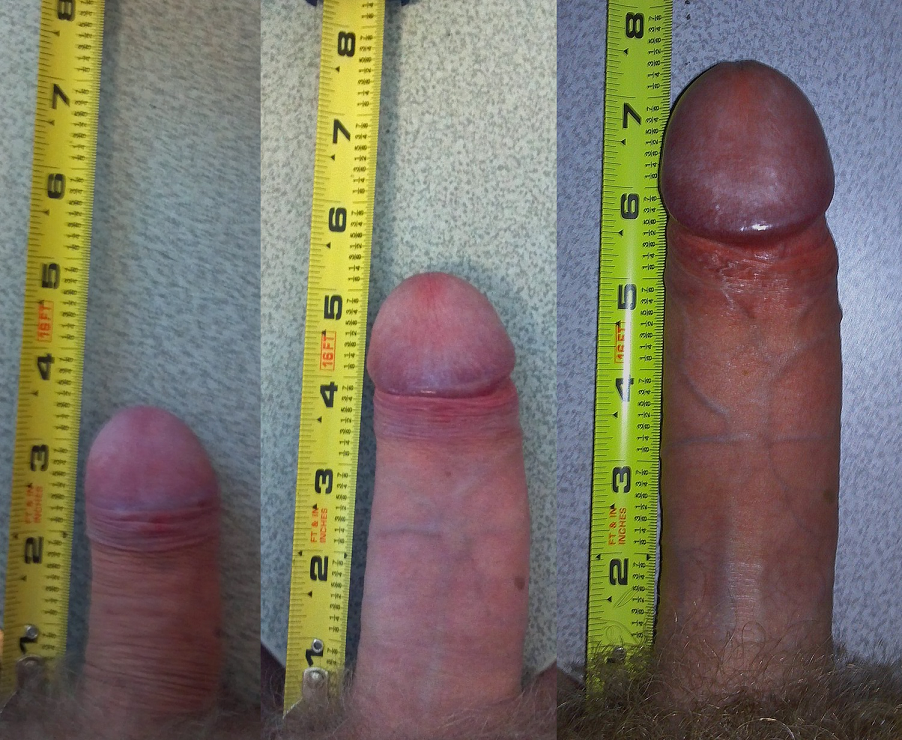
A human penis in the flaccid (left) and erect (right) state

A 2020 review found most men believed the average erect penis length is more than 15.24 cm (6 inches). This inaccurate belief has likely been fed by inaccurate and exaggerated data presented in studies where the size of a participant's erect penis is self-reported. Participants may report overestimates of the size of their penis in the belief that a larger penis is more socially desirable. The same review analyzed the results from ten prior studies where measurements of erect penis size were made by researchers. They reported an erect penis to be between 12.95 and 13.92 cm (5.1 and 5.5 inches, respectively) in length, a result significantly below the average obtained in self-reported studies. The authors commented that results of such measurement studies may still be inflated due to volunteer bias — the possibility that men with larger penises may be more likely to choose to participate in such studies.

=== Erect circumference ===
Similar results exist regarding studies of the circumference of the adult fully erect penis, with the measurement usually taken mid-shaft. As with length, studies that relied on self-measurement consistently reported a significantly higher average than those with staff measuring. In a study of penis size where measurements were taken in a laboratory setting, the average penis circumference when erect was 11.66 cm (4.59 inches).

=== Size at birth and during childhood ===
The average stretched penile length at birth is about 4 cm (1.6 in), and the length for 90% of newborn boys is between 2.4 and 5.5 cm (0.94 and 2.17 in). Limited growth of the penis occurs between birth and 5 years of age, but very little occurs between 5 years and the onset of puberty. The average size at the beginning of puberty is 6 cm (2.4 in), with adult size reached about 5 years later.

W. A. Schonfeld published a penis growth curve in 1943.

=== Size in older men ===
Age is not believed to negatively correlate with penis size.

=== Size and height ===
Height is very weakly correlated with flaccid stretched length.

=== Size and hands ===
A study investigating the relationship with digit ratio found men with longer ring fingers than index fingers had longer penises, and it was the only significant predictor of both stretched and erect penis length. However, the common misconception that overall hand size predicts penis size has been widely discredited.

=== Size and other body parts ===
There is no correlation between shoe size and stretched penis size.

Nose size was highly related to stretched penile length in Japanese male cadavers.

There may be a link between the malformation of the genitalia and the human limbs. The development of the penis in an embryo is controlled by some of the same Hox genes (in particular HOXA13 and HOXD13) as those that control the development of the limbs. Mutations of some Hox genes that control the growth of limbs cause malformed genitalia (hand–foot–genital syndrome).

=== Obesity and perceived size ===
Excess adipose tissue in the pubic region can obscure penile length, a condition known as buried penis. In such cases, the penis is of normal size but is partially or completely hidden by the surrounding fat pad. A cross-sectional study of 680 obese boys found that 30.88% had buried penis, while 9.12% met criteria for micropenis based on stretched penile length measurements. Standard clinical measurement of penile length involves pushing the pre-pubic fat pad to the pubic bone to obtain an accurate reading, distinguishing true penile length from apparent length.

=== Size, race, and ethnicity ===
Alleged differences in races have led to the creation of sexual myths. There is no scientific background to support the alleged "oversized" penis in black people. There is no indication that penis size differs between ethnicities.

According to urologist Aaron Spitz, many websites and studies promoting variation of penis size between races use unscientific methods of collecting information and often ignore contradictory evidence. He concludes that "when you really take a good look at the naked data, there's not a whole lot there [showing racial variation in penis size]."

A 2024 meta-analysis of 34,060 Chinese men found that while flaccid penis length was shorter on average than the global reference population, erect length showed no statistically significant difference. The study found that Chinese men had a higher average increase from flaccid to erect state (67%) compared to the global average (43%), meaning a greater proportion fell into the category colloquially known as "growers" rather than "showers." The authors noted this has implications for older cross-population studies, many of which relied on flaccid rather than erect measurements: populations with more "growers" would appear smaller in flaccid-based datasets even when erect dimensions are comparable.

While some meta-analyses have identified modest average differences across geographic regions, the variation in penis size within any racial or ethnic group vastly exceeds the differences between groups. Individual variation within any racial group spans over 7 cm (3 inches) in some datasets, a range that is 15 to 30 times greater than the alleged average differences between racial groups, which typically measure less than 0.5 cm (0.2 inches) in clinician-measured studies. Factually race is therefore a poor predictor of any individual's penis size, and reported racial averages do not account for the substantial overlap between group distributions.

=== Size preferences among sexual partners ===
In a 1994 cover story by Psychology Today, 1,500 readers (about two-thirds women) were surveyed about male body image. Many of the women were not particularly concerned with penis size, and over 71% thought men overemphasized the importance of penis size and shape. Generally, the women polled cared more about width than men thought, and less about length than men thought, although the strength of preference for either among women showed a similar pattern.

A small study of 50 undergraduate women surveyed by two popular male athletes on campus about their perceptions of sexual satisfaction found that penile girth contributed more than penile length when subjects are asked to choose between the two (size was left unspecified). It was also concluded that this may show that penis size overall affects sexual satisfaction, since women chose between the two options they were given.

A 2002 study at Groningen University Hospital, asked 375 sexually active women (who had recently given birth) the importance of penis size. The results showed that 21% of women thought length was important and 32% thought that girth was important.

A 2013 study conducted at the Australian National University, showed that penis size influences a man's sex appeal, and the taller the man, the bigger the effect. The study showed life-sized 3D computer-generated images, altering the height and other physical attributes, with women typically registering preferences in under 3 seconds. A preference for taller men's larger penis size was indicated.

A 2015 US study of the stated preferences of 75 women using 3D-printed models as references showed a preferred penis length of 16 cm (6.3 in) and a preferred circumference of 12.2 cm (4.8 in) for long-term sexual partners, with slightly larger preferred sizes of a length of 16.3 cm (6.4 in) and circumference of 12.7 cm (5.0 in) for one-time sexual encounters. Many studies measure length "bone pressed" where the pubic fat pad is compressed to give a larger measurement, but due to the methods the above numbers are effectively not "bone pressed". This difference in measurement method was found to be on average 1.8 cm (0.7 in). So preferred length of long term and one time partners was 17.8 cm (7.0 in)and 18.1 cm (7.1 in) respectively.

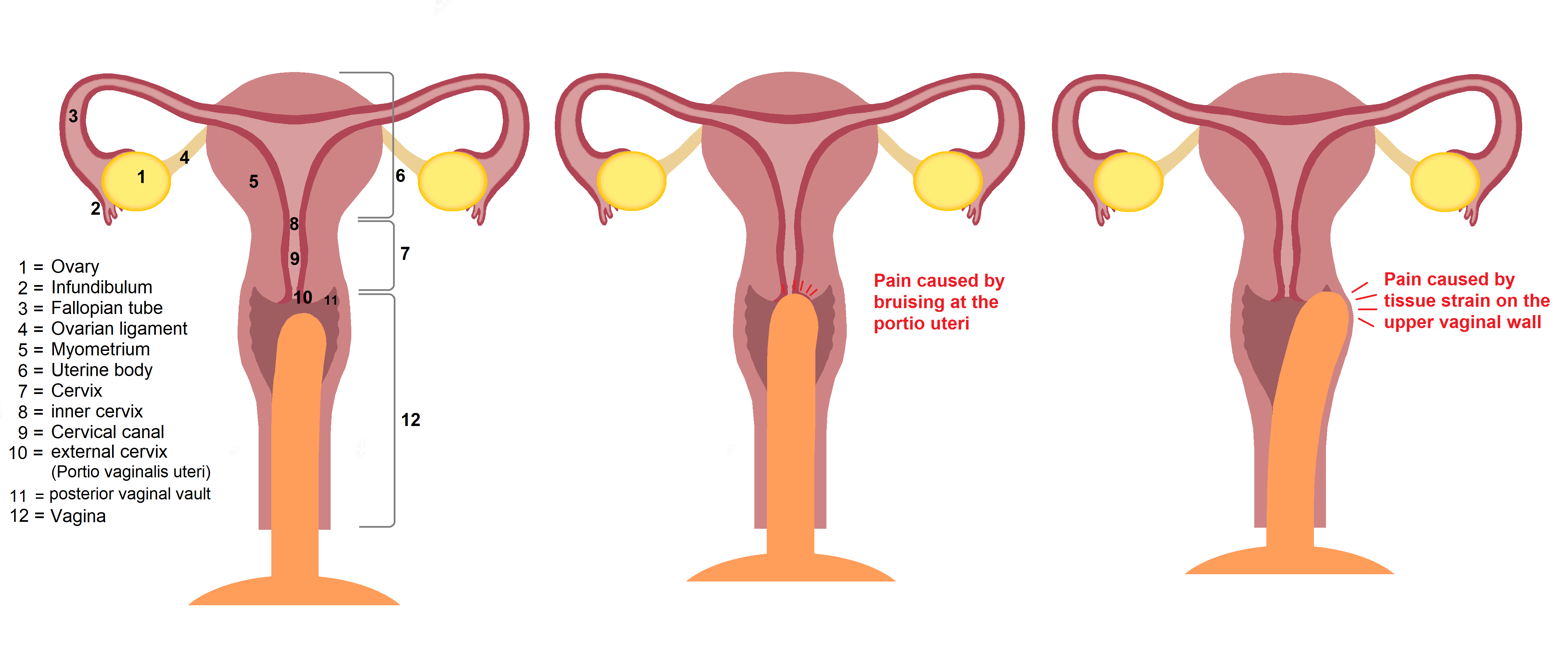
Two possible causes of pain for the female during penile-vaginal intercourse shown with diagrams of the female anatomy

According to the study, however, when estimating the length of their partner's penis, most women would say a size significantly smaller than what their partner was recorded to be. This suggests that perception of size is not entirely accurate. The visual impression of the size is not necessarily in correlation with the feeling in the vulva and vagina. A very long penis can cause dyspareunia, if the man does not understand how to use it carefully.

=== Condom use ===
One Australian study of 184 men looked at penis length and circumference in relation to condom breakage or slippage. 3,658 condoms were used. The study found that when used correctly, condoms had a breakage rate of 1.34% and a slippage rate of 2.05%, for a total failure rate of 3.39%. Penile dimensions did not influence slippage, although penis circumference and broken condoms were strongly correlated, with larger sizes increasing the rate of breakage.

== Biochemistry ==
Androgens like testosterone are responsible for penis enlargement and elongation during puberty. Penis size is positively correlated with increasing testosterone levels during puberty. After puberty, administration of testosterone does not affect penis size, and androgen deficiency in adult men only results in a small decrease in size. Growth hormone (GH) and insulin-like growth factor 1 (IGF-1) are also involved in penis size, with deficiency (such as that observed in growth hormone deficiency or Laron syndrome) at critical developmental stages having the potential to result in micropenis.

== Variance ==
=== Microphallism ===
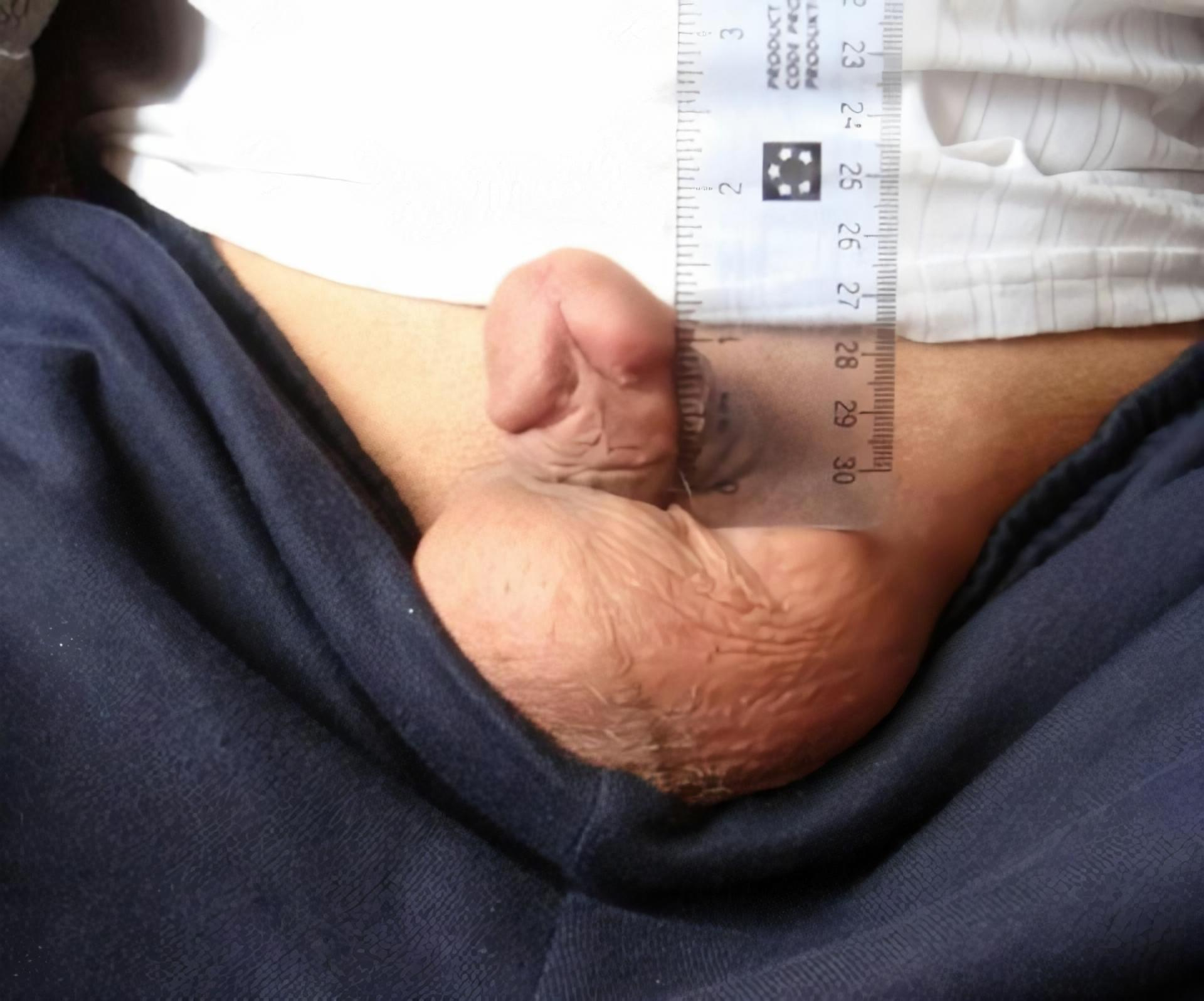
Measuring erect micropenis

An adult penis with an erect length of 2.5 standard deviations (SD) below the average but otherwise formed normally is referred to in a medical context as having the micropenis condition. The condition affects 0.6% of men. Some of the identifiable causes are deficiency of pituitary growth hormone or gonadotropins, mild degrees of androgen insensitivity, a variety of genetic syndromes and variations in certain homeobox genes. Some types of micropenis can be addressed with growth hormone or testosterone treatment in early childhood. Operations are also available to increase penis size in cases of micropenis in adults.

=== Macrophallism ===
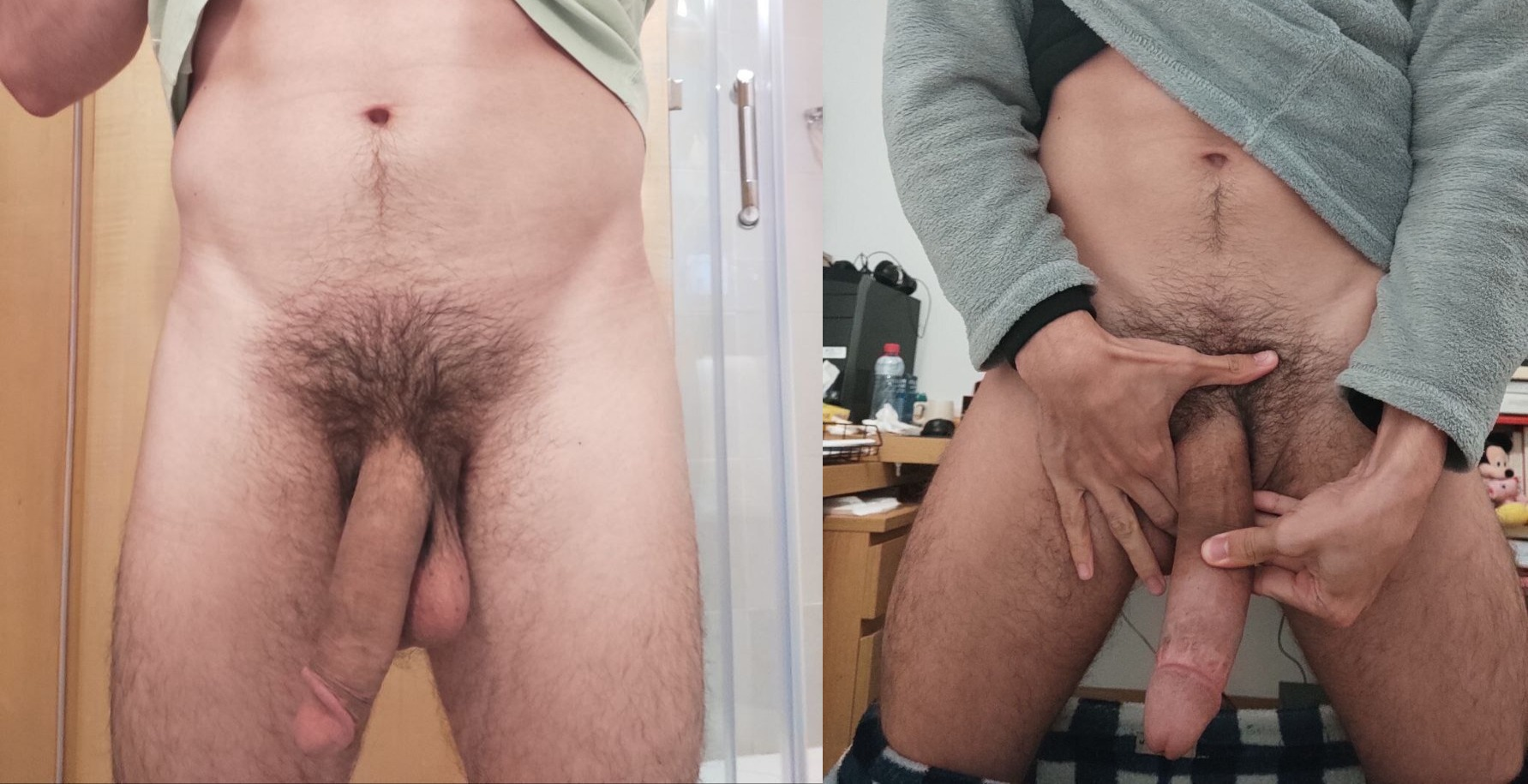
Flaccid and erect comparison on a man with macrophallism

Macrophallism, macrophallus, or macropenis, is a condition defined in a medical context as an adult or juvenile penis with an erect length of 2.5 standard deviations (SD) above the average (approximately seven inches or 17.8 cm in length post-puberty) but otherwise formed normally. It is generally characterized by substantial penile girth or length, sometimes causing functional issues. The condition is occasionally associated with underlying conditions like priapism, palmar fibromatosis, hypertrophy, and sickle cell disease. Treatment for macrophallism is extremely uncommon, and only for when penetration isn't possible, but primarily include penis reduction.

=== Environmental influence ===
It has been suggested that differences in penis size between individuals are caused not only by genetics, but also by environmental factors such as culture, diet and chemical or pollution exposure. Endocrine disruption resulting from chemical exposure has been linked to genital deformation in both sexes (among many other problems). Chemicals from both synthetic (e.g., pesticides, anti-bacterial triclosan, plasticizers for plastics) and natural (e.g., chemicals found in tea tree oil and lavender oil) sources have been linked to various degrees of endocrine disruption.

Both PCBs and the plasticizer DEHP have been associated with smaller penis size. DEHP metabolites measured from the urine of pregnant women have been significantly associated with the decreased penis width, shorter anogenital distance and the incomplete descent of testicles of their newborn sons, replicating effects identified in animals. According to a 2008 study published by the US National Library of Medicine, approximately 25% of US women have phthalate levels similar to those observed in animals.

Penile size may decrease as a result of some hormonal therapy combined with external beam radiation therapy. In addition, some estrogen-based fertility drugs like diethylstilbestrol (DES) have been linked to genital abnormalities or a smaller than normal penis (microphallus).

A 2023 systematic review and meta-analysis of 75 studies, covering 55,761 men across data collected between 1942 and 2021, found that average erect penis length increased by approximately 24% over the past 29 years globally, across all age groups and geographic regions. The authors noted that this rapid rate of change, too fast to be explained by genetic drift alone, points toward environmental or lifestyle factors as likely contributors. They drew a parallel with concurrent trends in male reproductive health, including declining sperm counts and testosterone levels and rising rates of genital birth defects such as hypospadias, which have similarly been attributed to environmental exposures. Specific hypothesized mechanisms include increased prenatal and postnatal exposure to endocrine-disrupting chemicals, as well as earlier onset of puberty, itself potentially linked to sedentary lifestyles or hormonal disruption.

== Historical perceptions ==
=== Ancient ===
Perceptions of penis size are culture-specific. Some prehistoric sculptures and petroglyphs depict male figures with exaggerated erect penises. Ancient Egyptian cultural and artistic conventions generally prohibited large penises from being shown in art, as they were considered obscene, but the scruffy, balding male figures in the Turin Erotic Papyrus are shown with exaggerated, large genitals. The Egyptian god Geb is sometimes shown with a massive erect penis and the god Min is almost always shown erect.

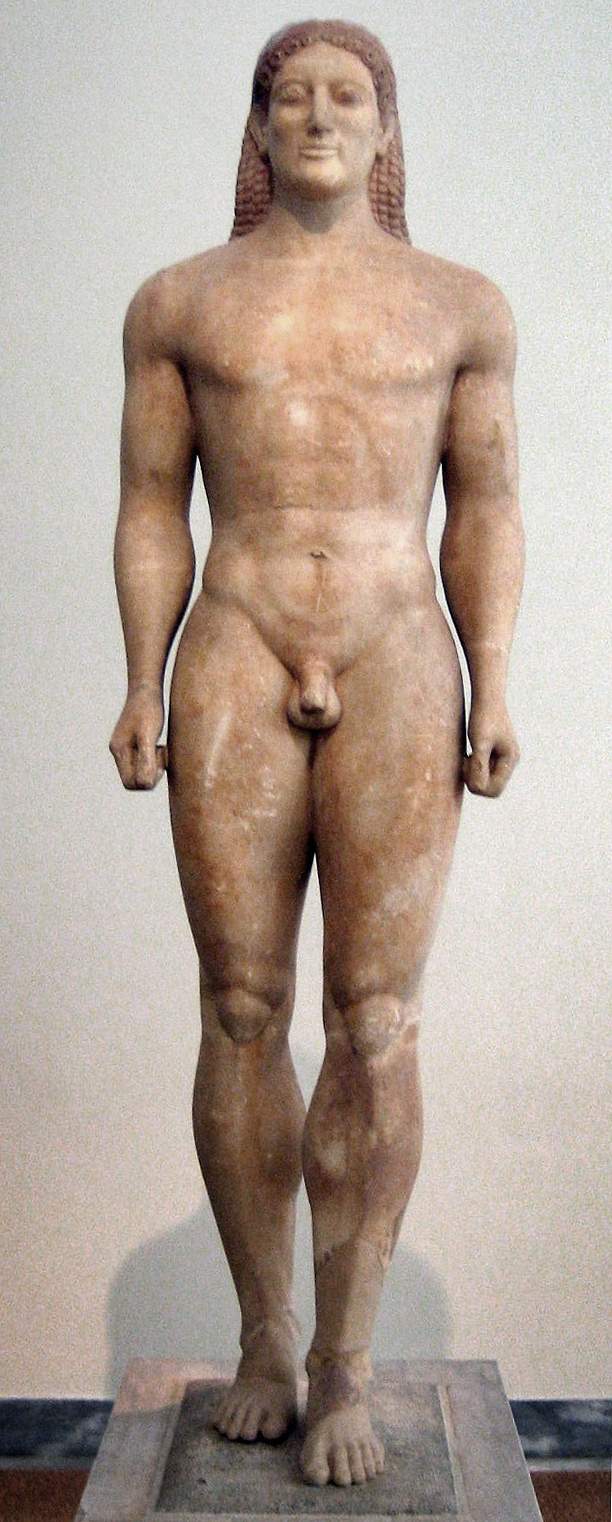
Ancient Greek kouros sculpture from Anavyssos dating to c. 530 BC, showing an idealized young man with a flaccid penis

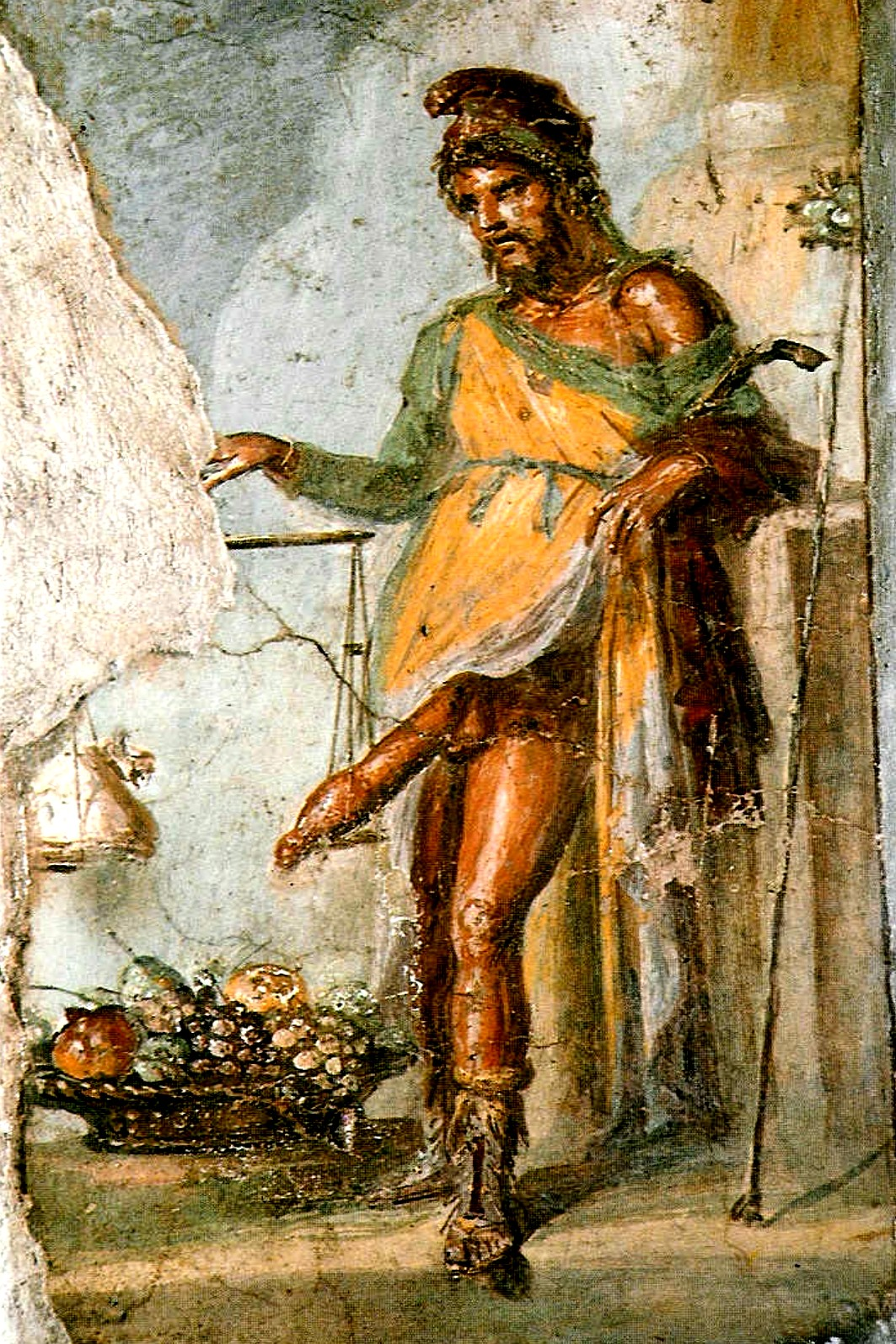
Ancient Roman fresco from the House of the Vettii in Pompeii, dating to the first century AD, showing the god Priapus weighing his massive, permanently erect penis against a bag of gold

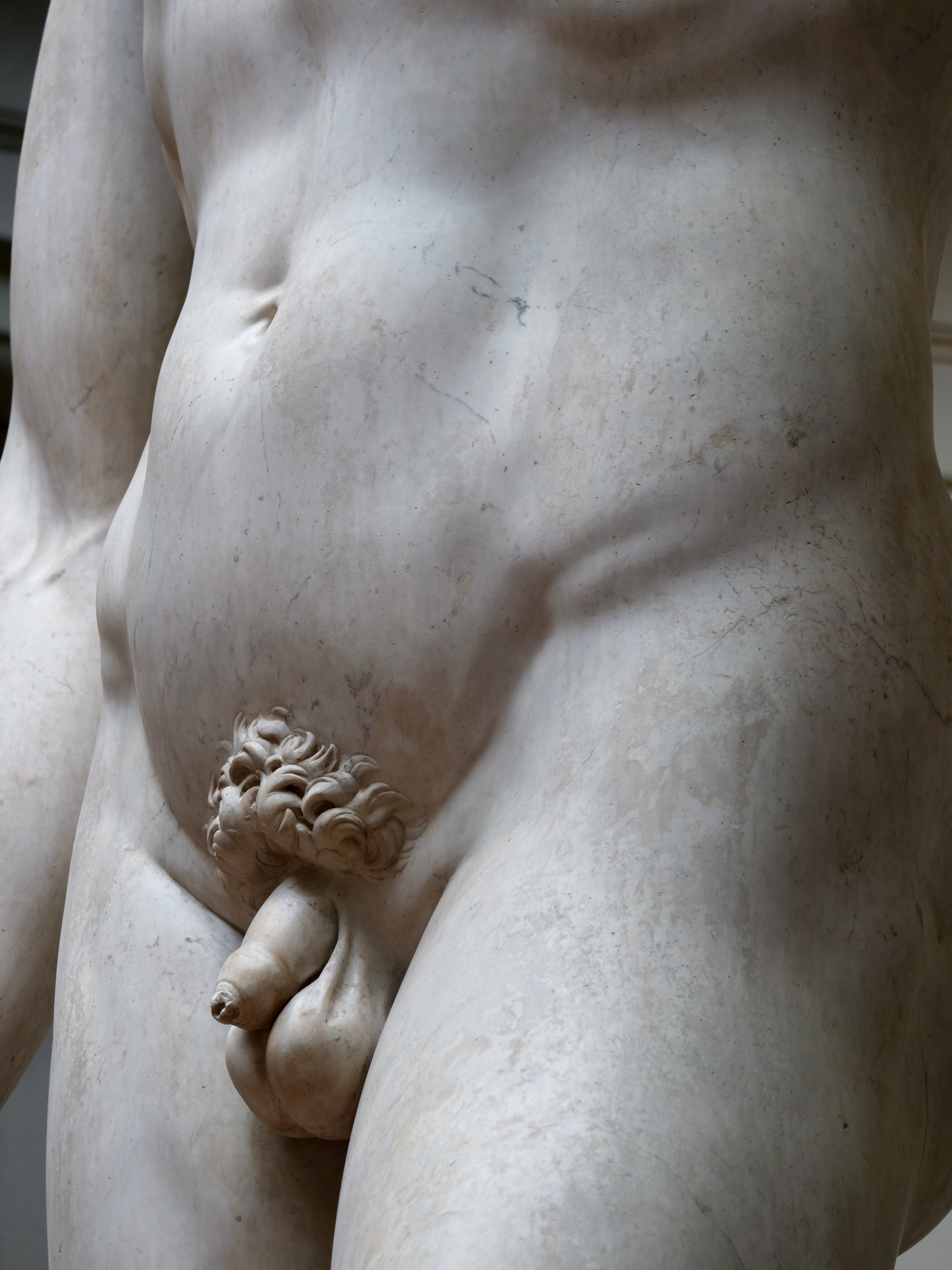
David (1504) by Michelangelo

Men in ancient Greece believed that small penises were ideal. Scholars contend that the penis size of most ancient Greeks was likely similar to that of other Europeans. Yet, Greek art indicates that petite penises were the aesthetic standard through illustrations of handsome youths that feature tiny, uncircumcised penises with disproportionately large foreskins. Additionally, in Aristophanes's comedy The Clouds, "Mr. Good Reason" gives the character Pheidippides a description of the ideal youth: "A glistening chest and glowing skin / Broad shoulders, a small tongue /A mighty bottom and a tiny prong." A dainty penis symbolized the concept of sophrosyne, an important attribute of ancient Greek masculinity related to self-control and a balanced physique.

Furthermore, ancient Greeks associated large penises with hubris, the opposite of sophrosyne. Non-citizens, including slaves, foreigners, and other marginalized groups, were depicted with giant penises to differentiate and demean them. Exaggerated penises were also used for comically grotesque figures, such as satyrs, a class of hideous, horse-like woodland spirits, who are represented with absurdly massive penises in ancient Greek art. Actors portraying male characters in ancient Greek comedy also wore enormous, fake, red penises, which dangled underneath their costumes; these were intended as ridiculous and were meant to be laughed at.

In Greek mythology, Priapus, the god of fertility, had an impossibly large penis that was permanently erect. Priapus was widely seen as hideous and unattractive. A scholion on Apollonius of Rhodes's Argonautica states that when Priapus' mother Aphrodite, the goddess of love and beauty, gave birth to him, she was so horrified by the size of his penis, his massive potbelly, and his huge tongue that she abandoned him to die in the wilderness. A herdsman found him and raised him as his son, later discovering that Priapus could use his massive penis to aid in the growth of plants.

Nonetheless, there are indications that the Greeks had an open mind about large penises. A statue of the god Hermes with an exaggerated penis stood outside the main gate of Athens and in Alexandria in 275 BC, a procession in honor of Dionysus hauled a 180-foot phallus through the city and people venerated it by singing hymns and reciting poems.

The Romans, in contrast to the Greeks, seem to have admired large penises and many large phalli have been recovered from the ruins of Pompeii. Depictions of Priapus were very popular in Roman erotic art and literature. Over eighty obscene poems dedicated to him have survived.

Penis size is alluded to in the Bible:

^{18} And she revealed her whorings, and she revealed her nakedness, and so I turned from her just as I turned from her sister. ^{19} Yet she increased her whorings, recalling the days of her childhood when she was prostituted in the land of Egypt. ^{20} And she lusted after her male lovers whose genitalia were the genitalia of male donkeys and their seminal emission was the seminal emission of horses. Ezekiel 23:18–20 Lexham English Bible

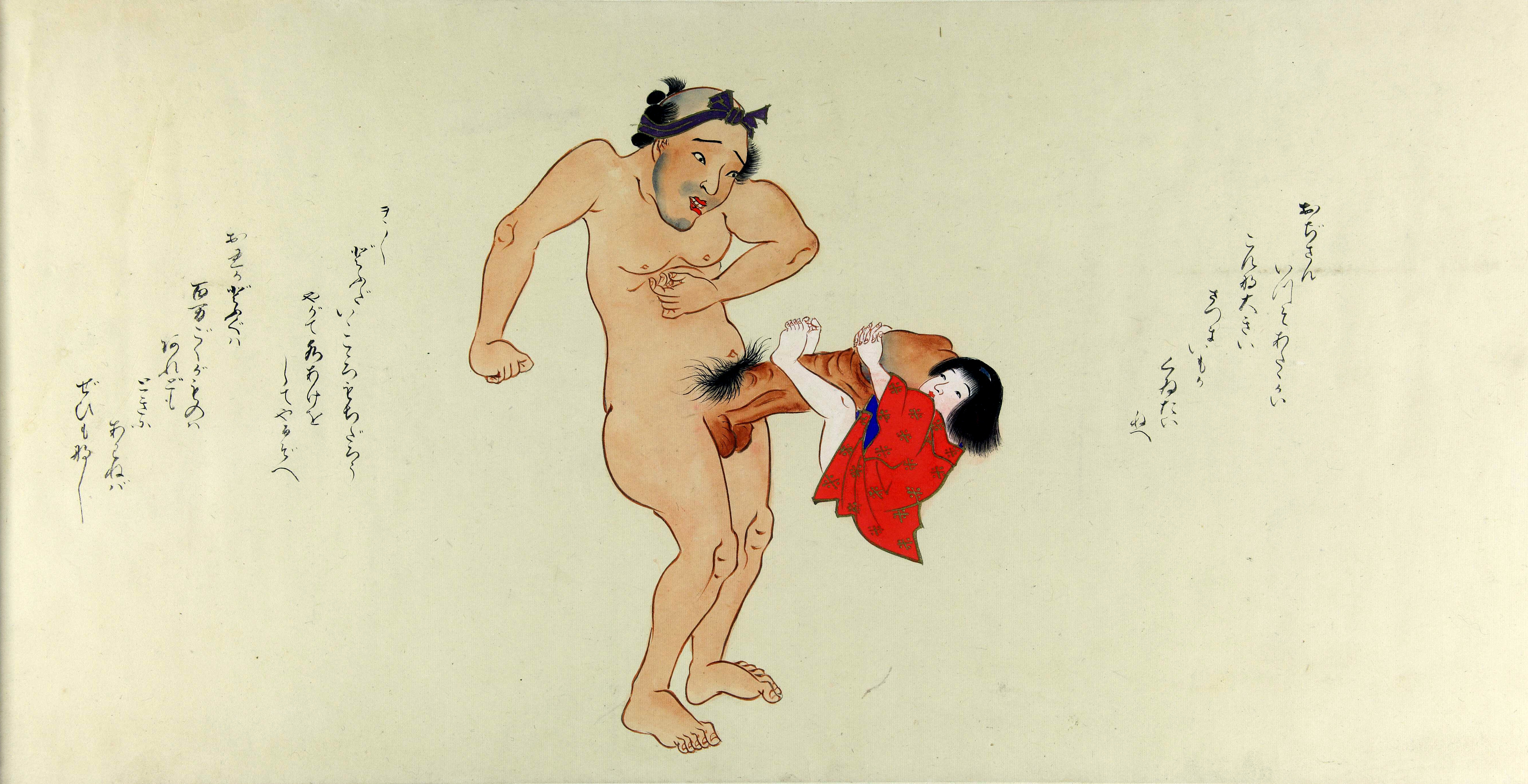
A 19th-century Japanese shunga handscroll attributed to the school of Utagawa Kuniyoshi, depicting exaggerated male genitalia. Ink, colour and gold on paper. British Museum collection.

Ancient Chinese legend holds that a man named Lao Ai had the largest penis in history and that he had an affair with Queen Dowager Zhao (c. 280–228 BC), the mother of Qin Shi Huang, by pretending to be a eunuch. Ancient Koreans admired large penises and King Jijeung (437–514 AD) of the Silla Dynasty is said to have had a forty-five-centimeter penis that was so large his subordinates had to search for a woman that fit him. Traditional Japanese erotic paintings usually show genitals as exaggeratedly large. The oldest known painting of this type, found in the Hōryū-ji Temple in Ikaruga, dates to the eighth century AD and depicts a fairly large penis.

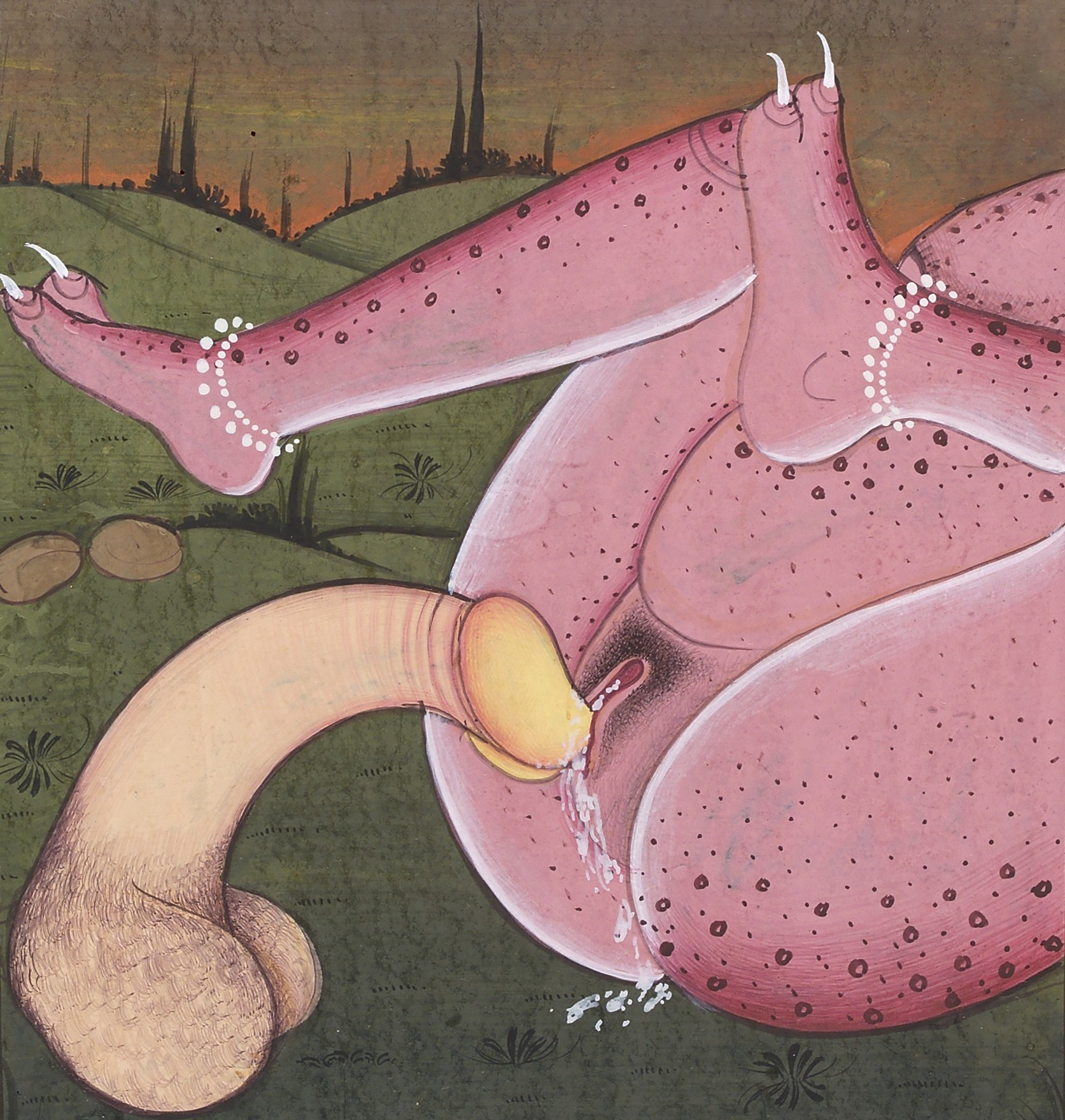
A giant phallus copulating with a female demon figure. Gouache painting, India. Wellcome Collection.

The ancient Indian sexual treatise Kama Sutra, written in Sanskrit, probably between the second and fourth centuries AD, divides men into three classes based on penis size: "hare" size (about 5–7 cm, or 2–3 inches, when erect), "bull" size (10–15 cm, or 4–6 inches), and "horse" size (18–20 cm, or 7–8 inches). The treatise also divides women's vaginas into three sizes ("deer", "mare", and "elephant") and advises that a man match the size of the vagina of the woman he is having sex with to the size of his own penis. It also gives medically dubious advice on how to enlarge one's penis using wasp stings.

=== Post-classical ===
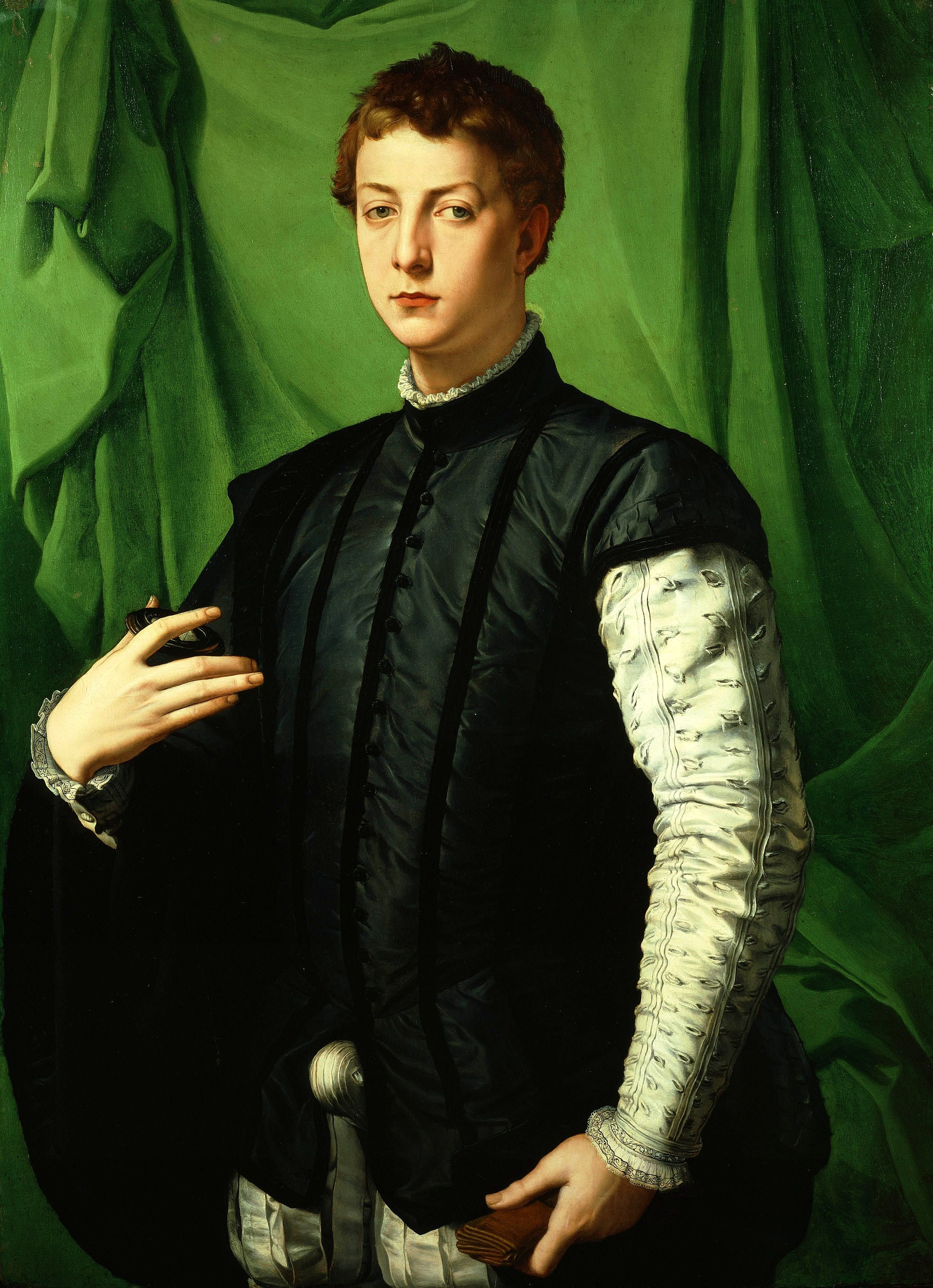
Portrait of Lodovico Caponi (painted c. 1550–1555) by Angelo Bronzino shows a codpiece peeking from underneath the young man's jacket. Larger codpieces were regarded as more fashionable.

In medieval Arabic literature, a longer penis was preferred, as described in an Arabian Nights tale called "Ali with the Large Member". As a witty satire of this fantasy, the 9th-century Afro-Arab author Al-Jahiz wrote: "If the length of the penis were a sign of honor, then the mule would belong to the Quraysh" (the tribe to which Muhammad belonged and from which he descended).

The medieval Norsemen considered the size of a man's penis as the measure of his manliness, and a thirteenth-century Norse magic talisman from Bergen, a wooden stave inscribed in runic script, promises its wearer: "You will fuck Rannveig the Red. It will be bigger than a man's prick and smaller than a horse's prick." A late fourteenth century account of the life of Saint Óláfr from the Flateyjarbók describes a pagan ritual which centered around a preserved horse's penis used as a cult artifact which members of the cult would pass around in a circle, making up verses in praise of it, encouraging it and the other members of the group to behave in sexually suggestive ways.

During the Renaissance, some men in Europe began to wear codpieces, which accentuated their genitals. There is no direct evidence that it was worn to enhance the apparent size of the wearer's penis, but larger codpieces were seen as more fashionable.

== Contemporary perceptions ==
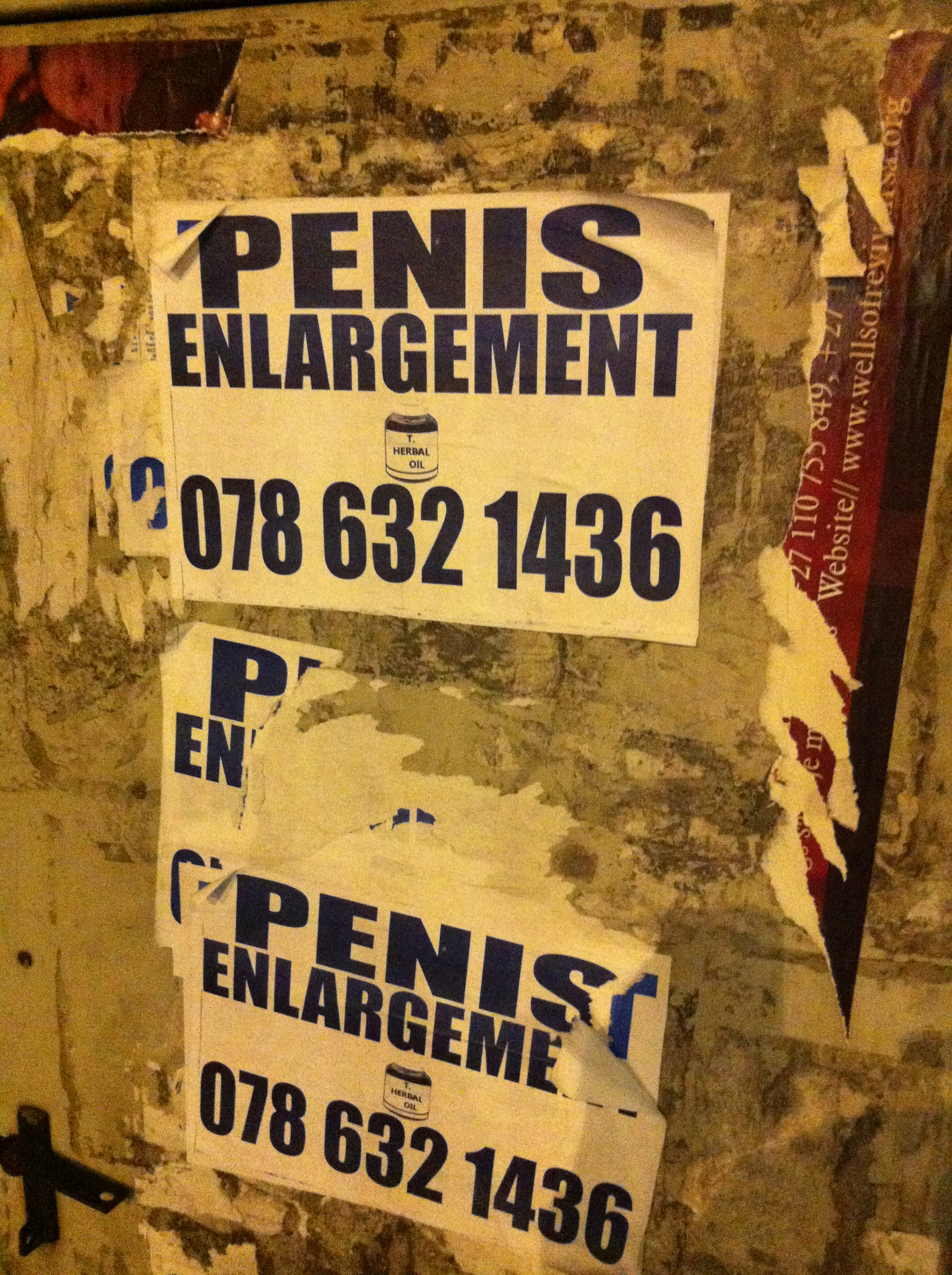
Sign in South Africa advertising penis enlargement

=== Male self-perception ===
Males may quite easily underestimate the size of their own penis relative to those of others. A survey by sexologists showed that many men who believed that their penis was of inadequate size had average-sized penises. Another study found sex education of standard penile measurements to be helpful and relieving for patients concerned about small penis size, most of whom had incorrect beliefs of what is considered medically normal. The study found that almost all of their patients that were concerned about their penis size overestimated the average penis size. The perception of having a large penis is often linked to higher self-esteem. Fears of shrinking of the penis in folklore have led to a type of mass hysteria called penis panic, though the penis legitimately can shrink in size due to scar tissue formation in the penis from a medical condition called Peyronie's disease. Marketers of penis enlargement products exploit fears of inadequacy, but there is no consensus in the scientific community of any non-surgical technique that permanently increases either the thickness or length of the erect penis that already falls into the normal range.

Small penis syndrome (SPS), a term sometimes used in medical literature, is characterized by an obsessive concern that the penis is smaller than average, often despite normal measurements. It has been associated with wider psychological disorders, including anxiety and body dysmorphic disorder. Assessment focuses on confirming normality and addressing underlying psychological factors.

=== Shrinking and enlarging ===
Widespread private concerns related to penis size have led to a number of folklore sayings and popular culture reflections related to penis size. Penis panic is a form of mass hysteria involving the believed removal or shrinking of the penis, known as genital retraction syndrome. The penis can significantly shrink due to scar tissue formation from a condition called Peyronie's disease which affects up to 10% of men. Products such as penis pumps, pills, and other dubious means of penis enlargement are some of the most marketed products in email spam. At present there is no consensus in the scientific community of any non-surgical technique that permanently increases either the thickness or length of the erect penis that already falls into the normal range (4.5" to 6").

=== Among male homosexuals ===
A study undertaken at Utrecht University found that the majority of gay men in the study regarded a large penis as ideal, and having one was linked to self-esteem. One study analysing the self-reported Kinsey data set found that the average penis of a homosexual man was larger than the average penis of their heterosexual counterparts (6.32 inches [16.05 cm] in length amongst gay men versus 5.99 in [15.21 cm] in heterosexuals, and 4.95 inches [12.57 cm] circumference amongst gay men versus 4.80 in [12.19 cm] in heterosexual men).

=== Pornography, black men, and penis size ===
While more than 46% of people have watched pornography, with 30%–90% of women and 60%–98% of men having watched it at some point in their lifespan, between 1973 and 2016, among and in comparison to other racial groups, Black women and Black men were reported to have watched the most porn. Pornography tends to depict Black people through racist and sexist stereotypes, such as Black people being hypersexual and animalistic, and sexually objectifies Black people through its emphasis and focus on sexual vigor and genitalia; this is socially generated and reinforced through production and supply of porn, such as Black porn and interracial porn that initially debuted in 1982 and big Black cock (BBC) porn, which then meets the demand from porn consumers, such as White men with fantasies about the sexuality of Black people in 1982 and porn consumers on Pornhub whose top search terms in 2022 were: "Black", the 13th most searched term, "BBC", the 9th most searched term, and "Ebony", the 3rd most searched term and the most searched category of 2022. Cosmetic changes and digital changes to genitalia can occur in porn, with the Labia minora of women being portrayed as smaller than the average size and the penis of men being portrayed as larger than the average size. Genital self-image is affected by the consumption of pornography as the primary focus of pornography is on genitalia and sexual acts. The genital self-image and focus for Black women were genital odor and appearance, and the genital self-image and focus for Black men were penis size; racially diverse study sample sizes indicate that, in contrast to women who tend to have a less positive genital self-image, men tend to have a more positive genital self-image.

== Evolution ==
The human penis is thicker than that of any other primate, both in absolute terms and relative to the rest of the body. Early research, based on inaccurate measurements, concluded that the human penis was also longer. In fact, the penis of the common chimpanzee is no shorter than in humans, averaging 14.4 cm (5.7 inches), and some other primates have comparable penis sizes relative to their body weight.

The evolutionary reasons for the increased thickness have not been established. One explanation is that thicker penises are an adaptation to a corresponding increase in vaginal size. The vaginal canal is believed to have expanded in humans to accommodate the larger size of a newborn's skull. Women may then have sexually selected men with penises large enough to fit their vagina, to provide sexual stimulation and ensure ejaculation.

Other evolutionary hypotheses to explain humans' relatively large penis length and girth include a sperm competition hypothesis and a mate competition hypothesis. The sperm competition hypothesis does not have much support as in other mammals where sperm competition is present, larger testes evolve, not larger penises. The mate competition hypothesis involves the prediction that a human with a larger penis would be able to displace the sperm of another. Studies have found that larger penises do not displace other sperm more effectively than smaller penises, but rather longer penises may ejaculate sperm inside the vagina in places that would be harder for a following penis to displace. The depth of pelvic thrusting was correlated to the displacement of competing sperm.

== See also ==
- Big dick energy
- Body dysmorphic disorder
- Erection
- Human penis
- Human vaginal size
- Penile dysmorphic disorder
- Penis enlargement
- Penis envy
- Phalloplasty
- Sexual selection in humans
- The Third Chimpanzee
- Why Is Sex Fun?
