= Sexing the Body =

2000 book by Anne Fausto-Sterling

Sexing the Body: Gender Politics and the Construction of Sexuality
- Author: Anne Fausto-Sterling
- Language: English
- Publisher: Basic Books
- Publication date: 2000
- Publication place: United States
- Media type: Print (Paperback and Hardback)
- Pages: 496
- ISBN: 978-0465077144

Sexing the Body: Gender Politics and the Construction of Sexuality is a 2000 book by the sexologist Anne Fausto-Sterling, in which the author explores the social construction of gender, and the social and medical treatment of intersex people. Her stated goal is to "convince readers of the need for theories that allow for a good deal of human variation and that integrate the analytical powers of the biological and the social into the systematic analysis of human development."

== Background ==
This book was published in the same year as As Nature Made Him, a book by John Colapinto about David Reimer that further debunked the gender theories of John Money. The examination and critique in Sexing the Body of the theories advanced by Money therefore lack the additional details uncovered by Colapinto.

== Synopsis ==
Drawing from the empirical research of intersex children, Anne Fausto-Sterling describes how the doctors address the issues of intersexuality. She starts her argument with an example of the birth of an intersexual individual and maintains "our conceptions of the nature of gender difference shape, even as they reflect, the ways we structure our social system and polity; they also shape and reflect our understanding of our physical bodies." Then she adds how gender assumptions affects the scientific study of sex by presenting the research of intersexuals by John Money et al., and she concludes that "they never questioned the fundamental assumption that there are only two sexes, because their goal in studying intersexuals was to find out more about 'normal' development." She also mentions the language the doctors use when they talk with the parents of the intersexuals. After describing how the doctors inform parents about the intersexuality, she asserts that because the doctors believe that the intersexuals are actually male or female, they tell the parents of the intersexuals that it will take a little bit more time for the doctors to determine whether the infant is a boy or a girl. That is to say, the doctors' behavior is formulated by the cultural gender assumption that there are only two sexes. Lastly, she maintains that the differences in the ways in which the medical professionals in different regions treat intersexual people also give us a good example of how sex is socially constructed. In her Sexing the Body: gender politics and the construction of sexuality, she introduces the following example:

A group of physicians from Saudi Arabia recently reported on several cases of XX intersex children with congenital adrenal hyperplasia (CAH), a genetically inherited malfunction of the enzymes that aid in making steroid hormones. [...] In the United States and Europe, such children, because they have the potential to bear children later in life, are usually raised as girls. Saudi doctors trained in this European tradition recommended such a course of action to the Saudi parents of CAH XX children. A number of parents, however, refused to accept the recommendation that their child, initially identified as a son, be raised instead as a daughter. Nor would they accept feminizing surgery for their child. [...] This was essentially an expression of local community attitudes with [...] the preference for male offspring.

Thus it is evident that culture can play a part in assigning gender, particularly in relation to intersex children.

== Critical reception ==
In a review for Politics and the Life Sciences, Laurette T. Liesen writes the book is "based on the premise that science is a social construction in which "created truths" about sex and gender are imposed on individuals" and "In a rather circular argument, Fausto-Sterling describes how studies on sexual differences in genetics, hormones, and the brain, as well as medical practices used on intersexuals, are gender-biased." A review in Hypatia by Heidi E. Grasswick notes that Fausto-Sterling uses the metaphor of a möbius strip "in an effort to describe not only the organization of the book, but more importantly, the complex nature of the relationship between the social and the material that she is striving to articulate through her detailed analyses of particular research programs."

According to Publishers Weekly, "As in her now classic book, Myths of Gender, Fausto-Sterling draws on a wealth of scientific and medical information, along with social, anthropological and feminist theory, to make the case that 'choosing which criteria to use in determining sex, and choosing to make the determination at all, are social decisions for which scientists can offer no absolute guidelines.'" In a review for Isis, Stephanie H. Kenen writes, "Despite its accessible appeal and riveting subject matter, Sexing the Body will likely be disappointing to the specialized audience that reads Isis. It is a popular book intended to introduce a nonscientific lay audience to the conceptual messiness of contemporary sex difference research."
