= Pedophilia: Biosocial Dimensions =

1990 book

- Editor: Jay R. Feierman
- Language: English
- Publisher: Springer-Verlag
- Publication date: 1990
- Publication place: United States
- Pages: 594
- ISBN: 9783540972433

Pedophilia: Biosocial Dimensions is a book edited by Jay R. Feierman, published by Springer in 1990.

== Content ==
The book contains 22 chapters by 25 researchers including Vern Bullough, John Money, Feierman, Irenäus Eibl-Eibesfeldt and Milton Diamond, among others, as well as an autobiography of pedophile pediatrician Donald Silva.

Parts of the book analyze pedophilia from an evolutionary perspective. It explores sexual behaviors similar to homosexuality in human societies such as Melanesia and traditional Hawaii.

== Reception ==
A review on the Archives of Sexual Behavior stated that "This is an excellent book", and that "Feierman has done science a service by bringing together this collection of objective studies."

A review published on the New England Journal of Medicine stated that this "book is a major contribution to the field. It deserves a strong recommendation."

A review by Deirdre Conway Rand on the IPT Journal stated that the book "both adds to our understanding of a complex human behavior and honestly acknowledges the fact that there is much that we still do not know."
