= Woman =

Female adult human

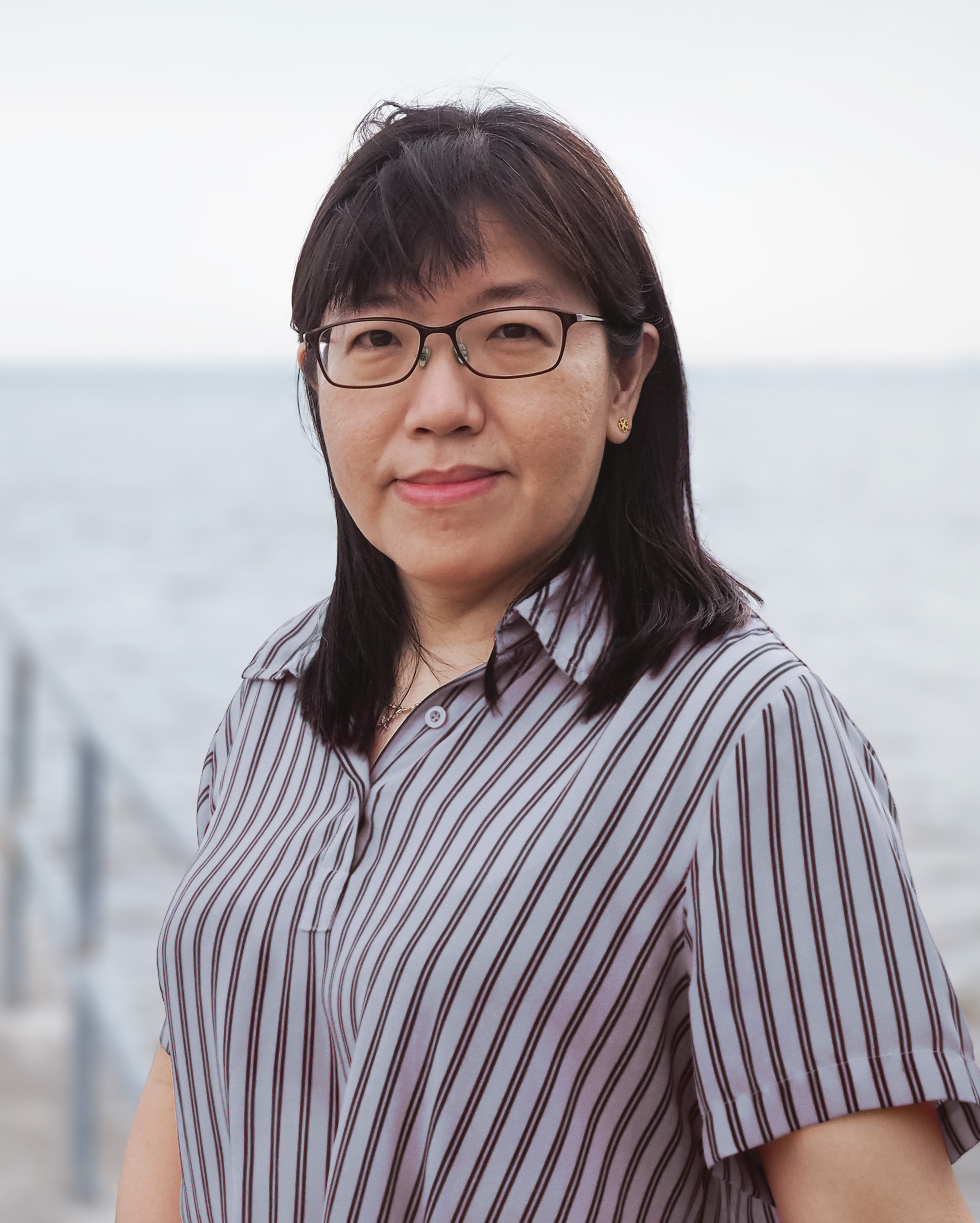
A woman

A woman is an adult female human. (Note: Female may refer to sex or gender. The plural women is sometimes used in certain phrases such as women's rights to denote female humans regardless of age.) Before adulthood, a female child or adolescent is referred to as a girl.

Anatomically the general female characteristic of human sexual dimorphism is the human female reproductive system, which includes the ovaries, fallopian tubes, uterus, vagina, and vulva. Accompanying characteristics are larger breasts, which might produce human milk, and generally a wider pelvis and broader hips. These characteristics facilitate pregnancy, childbirth and breastfeeding. Additional common characteristics are less facial and body hair, a higher body fat composition, shorter stature, and less muscle mass. Women are at greater risk of certain diseases like breast cancer, and at lower risk of other diseases like lung cancer. Genetically, women inherit typically a pair of X chromosomes, one from each parent. Sex differentiation of the female foetus is governed by the lack of a present functioning SRY gene on either one of the respective sex chromosomes.

Transgender women were assigned male at birth. Some women are intersex, meaning they have unusual sex characteristics (chromosomes, genitalia or internal sex organs), such as trisomy X or vaginal atresia.

Women are fundamental to human societies and have occupied positions at every level of society throughout history, but patriarchal gender roles have often limited or dominated women and femininity. With roles loosening during the 20th century in many societies, women have gained wider access to careers and education. Reproductive rights and women's rights have been raised globally, with some countries denying some of those rights to women. Violence against women is primarily committed by men. Many religions and governments stipulate certain rules for women. Feminist movements aim to achieve gender equality.

== Etymology ==
The spelling of woman in English has progressed over the past millennium from wīfmann to wīmmann to wumman, and finally, the modern spelling woman. In Old English, mann had the gender-neutral meaning of 'human', akin to the Modern 'person' or 'someone'. The word for 'woman' was wīf or wīfmann (lit. 'woman-person') whereas 'man' was wer or wǣpnedmann (from wǣpn 'weapon; penis'). However, following the Norman Conquest, man began to mean 'male human', and by the late 13th century it had largely replaced wer. The consonants /f/ and /m/ in wīfmann coalesced into the modern woman, while wīf narrowed to specifically mean a married woman ('wife').

It is a popular misconception that the term "woman" is etymologically connected to "womb". "Womb" derives from the Old English word wamb meaning 'belly, uterus' (cognate to the modern German colloquial term "Wamme" from Old High German wamba for 'belly, paunch, lap').

== Terminology ==
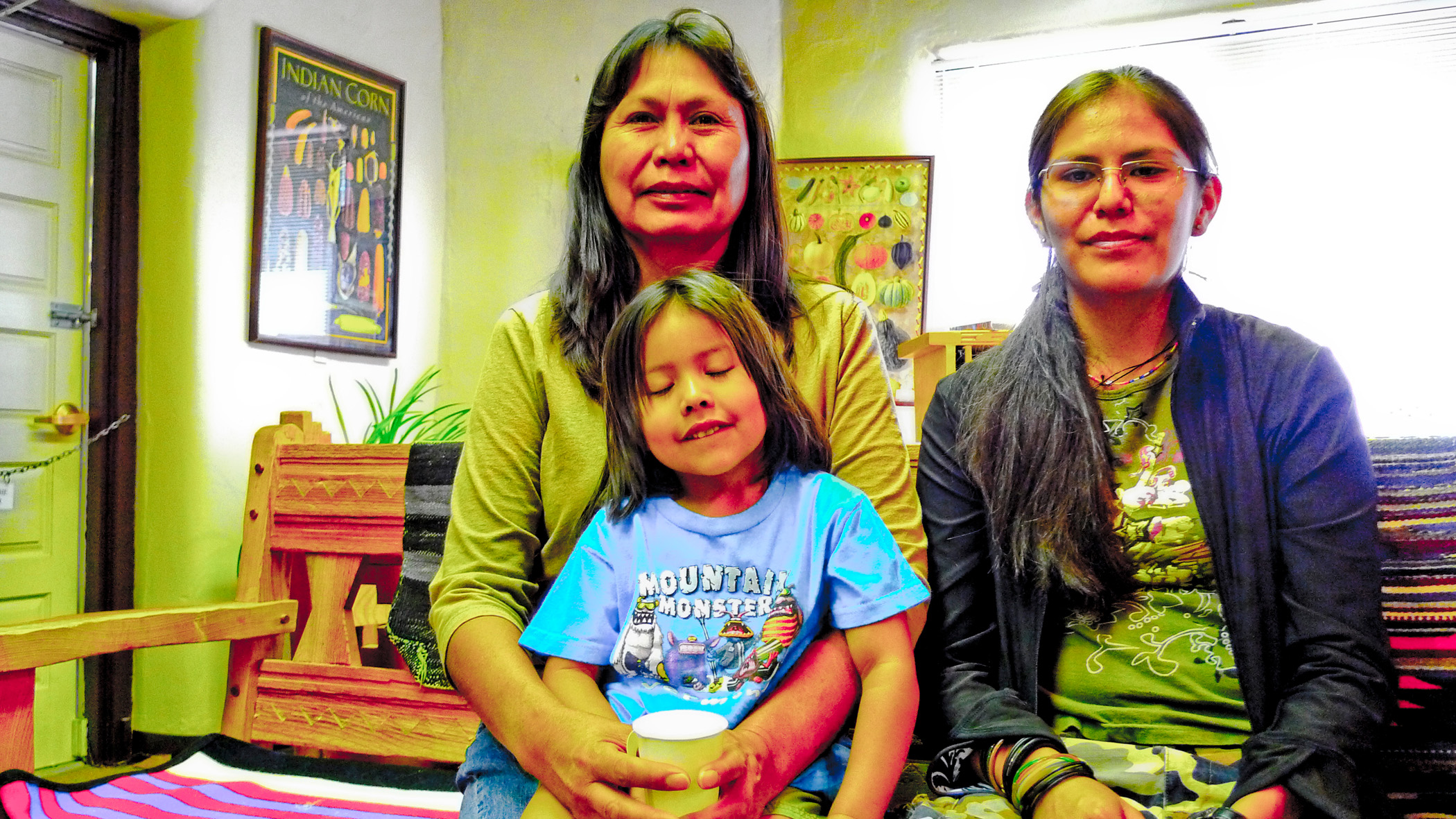
Three generations: grandmother, daughter, and granddaughter

The word woman can be used generally, to mean any female human, or specifically, to mean an adult female human as contrasted with girl. The word girl originally meant "young person of either sex" in English; it was only around the beginning of the 16th century that it came to mean specifically a female child. The term girl is sometimes used colloquially to refer to a young or unmarried woman; however, during the early 1970s, feminists challenged such use because the use of the word to refer to a fully grown woman may cause offence. In particular, previously common terms such as office girl are no longer widely used. Conversely, in certain cultures which link family honour with female virginity, the word girl (or its equivalent in other languages) is still used to refer to a never-married woman; in this sense it is used in a fashion roughly analogous to the more-or-less obsolete English maid or maiden.

The social sciences' views on what it means to be a woman have changed significantly since the early 20th century as women gained more rights and greater representation in the workforce, with scholarship in the 1970s moving toward a focus on the sex–gender distinction and social construction of gender.

Different countries have different laws, but age 18 is frequently considered the age of majority (the age at which a person is legally considered an adult). Menarche, the onset of menstruation, occurs on average at age 12–13. Many cultures have rites of passage to symbolise a girl's coming of age, such as bat mitzvah in Judaism, or a custom of a special celebration for a certain birthday (generally between 12 and 21), like the quinceañera of Latin America.

Alternative spellings of woman, such as womyn and wimmin, have been used in feminist contexts, especially since the 1970s.

== Biology ==
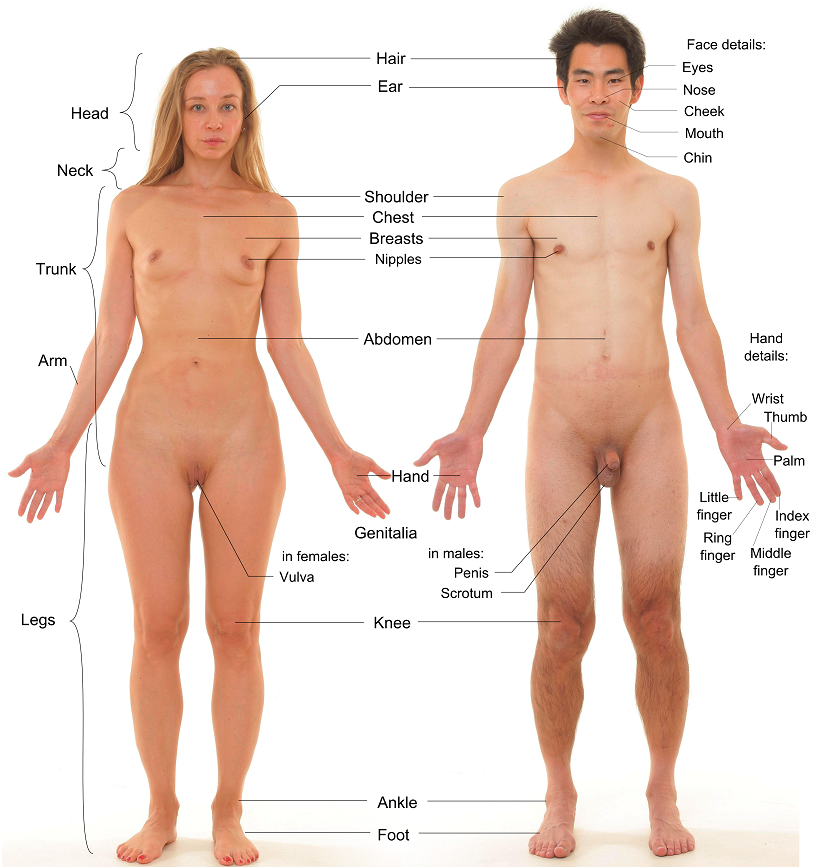
Photograph of an adult female human, with an adult male for comparison. The pubic hair of both models is removed.

=== Genetic characteristics ===
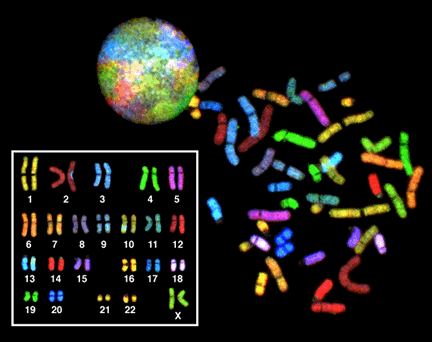
Spectral karyotype of a human female

Typically, the cells of female humans contain two X chromosomes, while the cells of male humans have an X and a Y chromosome. During early foetal development, all embryos have phenotypically female genitalia up until week 6 or 7, when a male embryo's gonads differentiate into testes due to the action of the SRY gene on the Y chromosome. Sex differentiation proceeds in female humans in a way that is independent of gonadal hormones. Because humans inherit mitochondrial DNA only from the mother's ovum, genealogical researchers can trace maternal lineage far back in time.

=== Puberty, menstruation and menopause ===
Female puberty triggers many bodily changes. In response to chemical signals from the pituitary gland, the ovaries secrete hormones that stimulate maturation of the body, including increased height and weight, body hair growth, breast development and menarche (the onset of menstruation). Most girls go through menarche between ages 12–13.

Menstruation is a monthly hormonal cycle that involves the shedding of the lining of the uterus. Blood and tissue exit through the vagina. Menstrual cycles may be irregular at first, and usually become more regular by a woman's 20s. Most women are able to perform all their daily activities during menstruation, though some women experience symptoms ranging from uncomfortable to disabling or are prohibited from regular activity by strong social stigma.

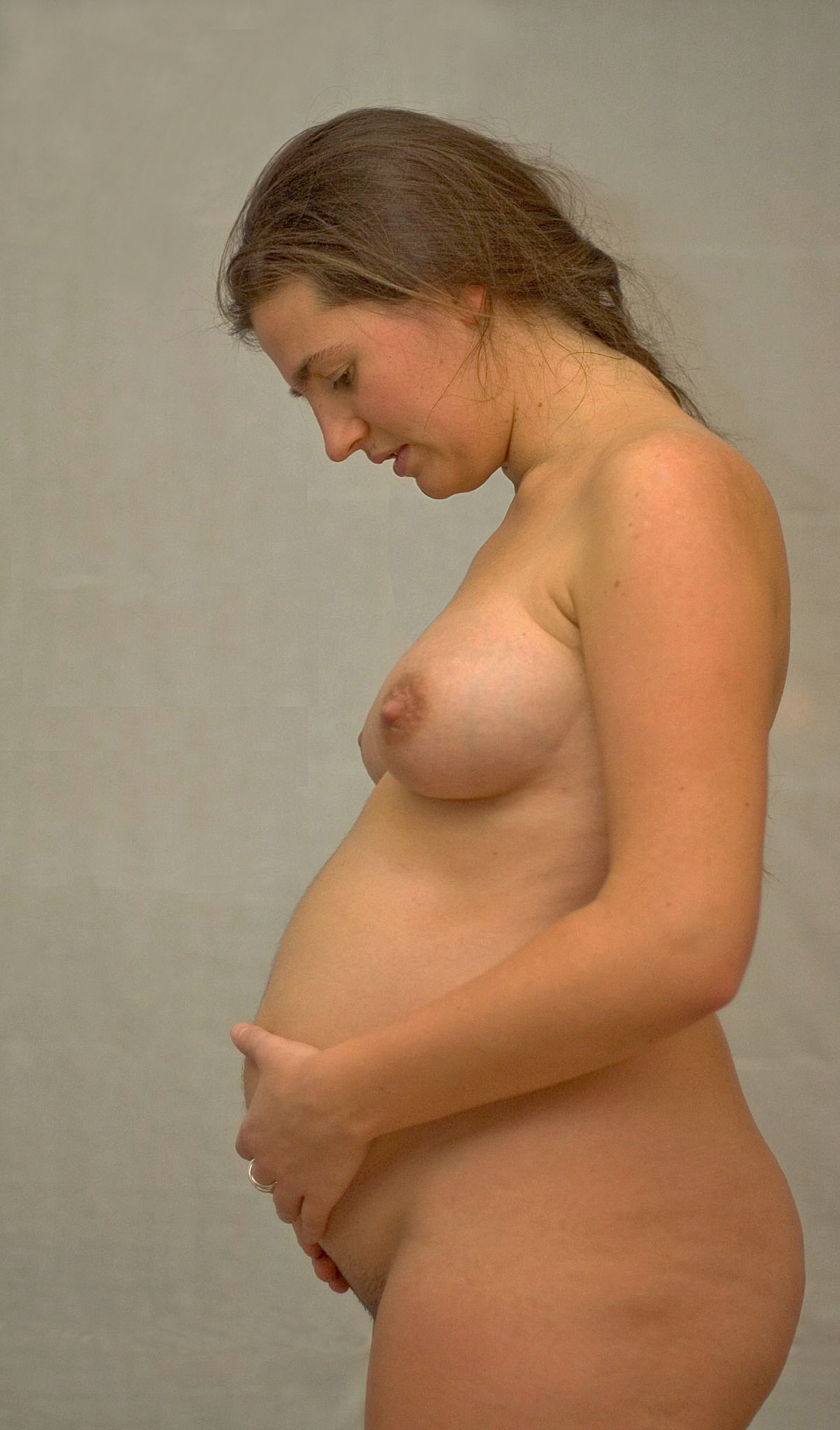
A pregnant woman

The changes of puberty typically enable sexual reproduction. Pregnancy generally requires fertilisation of a woman's egg cells with a man's sperm cells. Humans are similar to other large mammals in that they usually give birth to a single offspring per pregnancy, but are unusual in being altricial, meaning young are undeveloped at time of birth and require the aid of their parents or guardians to fully mature. Sometimes humans have multiple births, most commonly twins.

Usually between ages 49–52, a woman reaches menopause, the time when menstrual periods stop permanently, and they are no longer able to bear children. Symptoms of menopause include hot flashes, night sweats, headaches, and more; both lifestyle changes and medications can help to mitigate these symptoms.

=== Morphological and physiological characteristics ===
The human female reproductive system

In terms of biology, the female sex organs are involved in the reproductive system, whereas the secondary sex characteristics are involved in breastfeeding children and attracting a mate. Humans are placental mammals, which means the mother carries the foetus in the uterus and the placenta facilitates the exchange of nutrients and waste between the mother and foetus.

The internal female sex organs consist of:

- the ovaries, gonads that produce female gametes called ova,
- the fallopian tubes, tubular structures that transport the egg cells,
- the uterus, an organ with tissue to protect and nurture the developing foetus and its cervix to expel it,
- the accessory glands (Bartholin's and Skene's), two pairs of glands that help lubricate during intercourse, and
- the vagina, an organ used in copulating and birthing.

The vulva (external female genitalia) consists of the clitoris, labia majora, labia minora and vestibule. The vestibule is where the vaginal and urethral openings are located.

The mammary glands are hypothesised to have evolved from apocrine-like glands to produce milk, a nutritious secretion that is the most distinctive characteristic of mammals, along with live birth. In mature women, the breast is generally more prominent than in most other mammals; this prominence, not necessary for milk production, is thought to be at least partially the result of sexual selection.

Oestrogens, which are primary female sex hormones, have a significant impact on a female's body shape. They are produced in both men and women, but their levels are significantly higher in women, especially in those of reproductive age. Besides other functions, oestrogens promote the development of female secondary sexual characteristics, such as breasts and hips. As a result of oestrogens, during puberty, girls develop breasts and their hips widen. Working against oestrogen, the presence of testosterone in a pubescent female inhibits breast development and promotes muscle and facial hair development.

=== Circulatory system ===
Women have lower haematocrit (the volume percentage of red blood cells in blood) than men; this is due to lower testosterone, which stimulates the production of erythropoietin by the kidney. The normal haematocrit level for a woman is 36% to 48% (for men, 41% to 50%). The normal level of haemoglobin (an oxygen-transport protein found in red blood cells) for women is 12.0 to 15.5 g/dL (for men, 13.5 to 17.5 g/dL).

Women's hearts have finer-grained textures in the muscle compared to men's hearts, and the heart muscle's overall shape and surface area also differs to men's when controlling for body size and age. In addition, women's hearts age more slowly compared to men's hearts.

=== Sex distribution ===
Girls are born slightly less frequently than boys (the ratio is around 1:1.05). Out of the total human population in 2015, there were 1018 men for every 1000 women. Historically, male children tended to be preferred over female children, which led to exposure being commonplace. Female infanticide is less acceptable in contemporary times but still occurs.

=== Intersex women ===
Intersex women have an intersex condition, usually defined as those born with ambiguous genitalia, atypical chromosomes, or atypical gonads. Most individuals with ambiguous genitalia are assigned female at birth, and most intersex women are cisgender. The medical practices to assign binary female to intersex youth is often controversial.

Some intersex conditions are associated with typical rates of female gender identity, while others are associated with substantially higher rates of gender transition compared to the general population. For example, women with CAIS showed no psychological differences from non-intersex women, including in gender identity or orientation. Women with other intersex conditions, such as 5alpha-RD-2 or 17beta-HSD-3, showed increased rates of gender transition to live as men.

== Sexual orientation ==
Most women are heterosexual. Fewer than 5% of adults are primarily attracted to the same sex. Women who are primarily attracted to other women may be lesbian or bisexual.

== Gender ==
The Birth of Venus (1486, Uffizi) is a classic representation of femininity by Sandro Botticelli. Venus was a Roman goddess associated with love, beauty and fertility.

Most cultures use a gender binary by which women are of one of two genders, the others being men; other cultures have a third gender. Femininity (also called womanliness or girlishness) is a set of attributes, behaviours, and roles generally associated with women and girls. Different people have held femininity to be socially constructed, biologically influenced, or on some point in the spectrum between "nature" and "nurture". It is distinct from the definition of the biological female sex, as both men and women can exhibit feminine traits.

Most women are cisgender, meaning their female sex assignment at birth corresponds with their female gender identity. Some women are transgender, meaning they were assigned male at birth. Trans women may experience gender dysphoria, the distress brought upon by the discrepancy between a person's gender identity and their sex assigned at birth. Gender dysphoria may be treated with gender-affirming care, which may include social or medical transition. Social transition may involve changes such as adopting a new name, hairstyle, clothing, and pronoun associated with the individual's affirmed female gender identity. A major component of medical transition for trans women is feminising hormone therapy, which causes the development of female secondary sex characteristics (such as breasts, redistribution of body fat, and lower waist–hip ratio). Medical transition may also involve gender-affirming surgery, and a trans woman may undergo one or more feminising procedures which result in anatomy that is typically gendered female.

== Health ==
Factors that specifically affect the health of women in comparison with men are most evident in those related to reproduction, but sex differences have been identified from the molecular to the behavioural scale. Some of these differences are subtle and difficult to explain, partly due to the fact that it is difficult to separate the health effects of inherent biological factors from the effects of the surrounding environment they exist in. Sex chromosomes and hormones, as well as sex-specific lifestyles, metabolism, immune system function, and sensitivity to environmental factors are believed to contribute to sex differences in health at the levels of physiology, perception, and cognition. Women can have distinct responses to drugs and thresholds for diagnostic parameters. In 2025 only 62.7% of women aged 15 to 49 years consume a minimally diverse diet.

The medical practice dealing with female reproduction and reproductive organs is called gynaecology (etymologically, "science of women").

=== Disease risk ===
Women have higher rates of some diseases, such as osteoporosis, auto-immune diseases, Alzheimer's, and breast cancer. Women have lower rates of other diseases, such as lung cancer, Parkinson's, chronic liver disease, hypertension, diabetes, and HIV/AIDS. Some female-specific diseases include endometriosis, polyendocrine metabolic ovarian syndrome, and gynecologic cancers such as uterine or cervical cancer.

=== Maternal mortality ===
Maternal mortality or maternal death is defined by WHO as "the death of a woman while pregnant or within 42 days of termination of pregnancy, irrespective of the duration and site of the pregnancy, from any cause related to or aggravated by the pregnancy or its management but not from accidental or incidental causes."

Between 2000 and 2023, the rate of maternal mortality dropped by 40% worldwide. In 2023, around 260,000 women died from complications of pregnancy, delivery, or abortion. Over 90% of maternal mortality deaths occurred in low-income or lower-middle income countries, with sub-Saharan African and South Asian women accounting for 87% of the deaths. Most of these deaths were preventable. Maternal mortality can be reduced by ensuring pregnant women have adequate healthcare access, administering medications for preeclampsia and haemorrhage, and using good sanitation practices during delivery.

=== Life expectancy ===
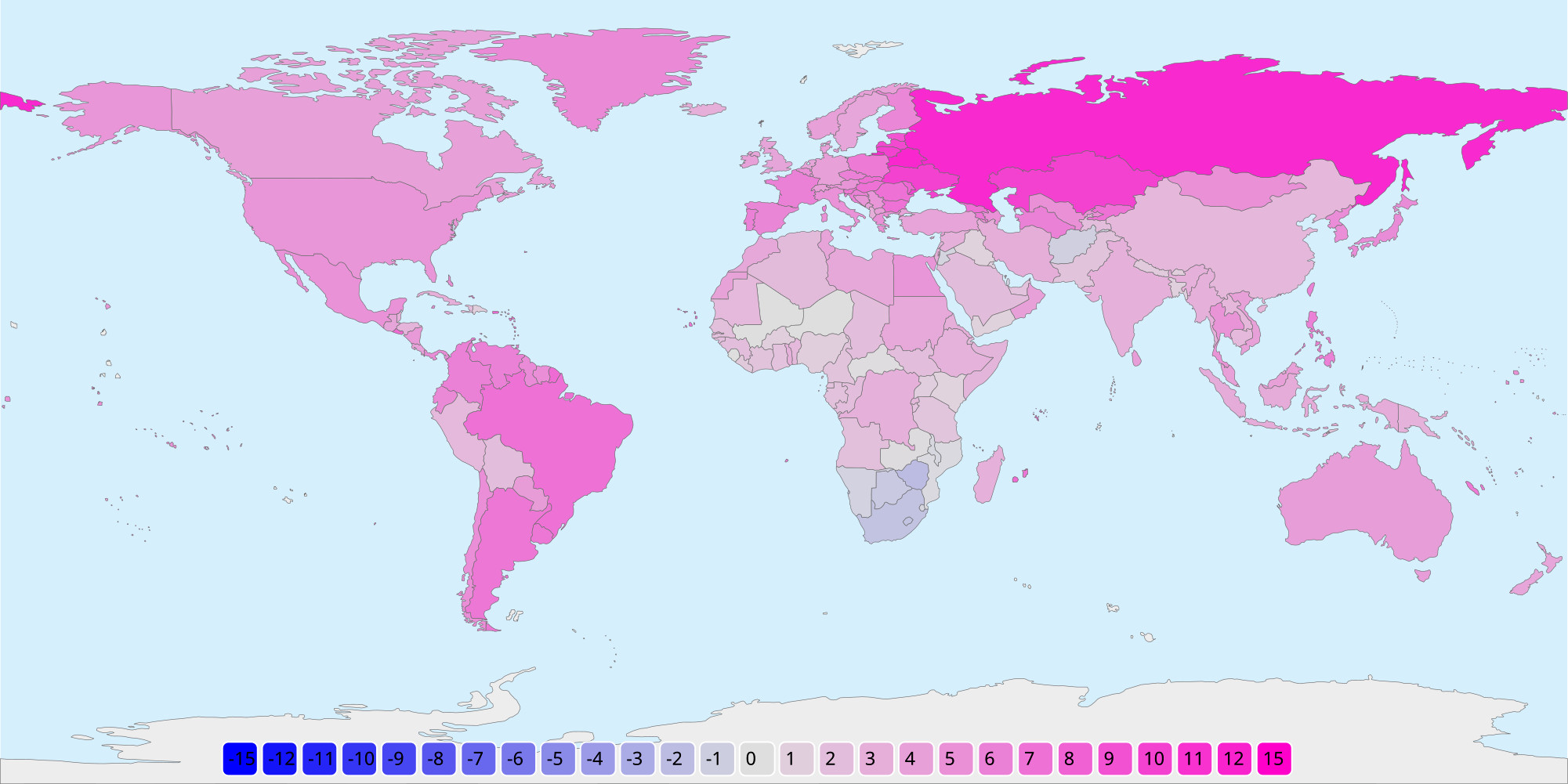
Pink: Countries where female life expectancy at birth is higher than males. Blue: A few countries in southern Africa where females have shorter lives due to AIDS.

The life expectancy for women is generally longer than for men. This advantage begins from birth, with newborn girls more likely to survive the first year than boys. Worldwide, women live six to eight years longer than men. However, this varies by place and situation. For example, discrimination against women has lowered female life expectancy in some parts of Asia so that men there live longer than women.

The difference in life expectancy is believed to be partly due to biological advantages and partly due to gendered behavioural differences between men and women. On average, women are less likely to engage in unhealthy behaviours like smoking and alcohol use, and consequently have fewer preventable premature deaths from such causes.

In some developed countries, the life expectancy is evening out. This is believed to caused both by worse health behaviours among women, especially an increased rate of smoking tobacco by women, and improved health among men, such as less cardiovascular disease. The World Health Organization (WHO) writes that "the extra years of life for women are not always lived in good health."

The fact that humans live for a significant period beyond their reproductive age is unusual among mammals. Many elderly women contribute to the care of grandchildren and other family members, and many biologists believe that the extended human lifespan is evolutionarily driven by kin selection, though other theories have also been proposed.

=== Reproductive rights ===
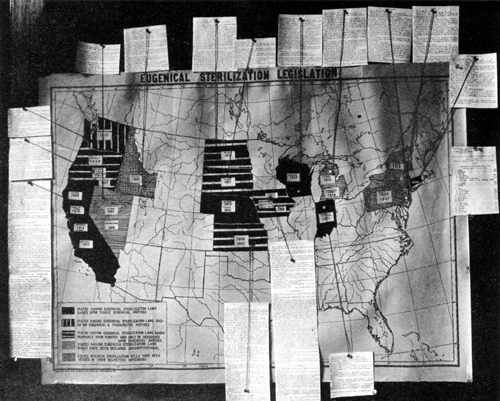
A poster from a 1921 eugenics conference displays the U.S. states that had implemented sterilisation legislation.

Reproductive rights are legal rights and freedoms relating to reproduction and reproductive health. The International Federation of Gynecology and Obstetrics has stated that:

... the human rights of women include their right to have control over and decide freely and responsibly on matters related to their sexuality, including sexual and reproductive health, free of coercion, discrimination and violence. Equal relationships between women and men in matters of sexual relations and reproduction, including full respect for the integrity of the person, require mutual respect, consent and shared responsibility for sexual behavior and its consequences.

The World Health Organization reports that based on data from 2010 to 2014, 56 million induced abortions occurred worldwide each year (25% of all pregnancies). Of those, about 25 million were considered as unsafe. The WHO reports that in developed regions about 30 women die for every 100,000 unsafe abortions and that number rises to 220 deaths per 100,000 unsafe abortions in developing regions and 520 deaths per 100,000 unsafe abortions in sub-Saharan Africa. The WHO ascribes these deaths to:

- restrictive laws
- poor availability of services
- high cost
- stigma
- conscientious objection of health-care providers
- unnecessary requirements, such as mandatory waiting periods, mandatory counselling, provision of misleading information, third-party authorisation, and medically unnecessary tests that delay care.

== History ==
The earliest women whose names are known include:

- Neithhotep (c. 3200 BCE), the wife of Narmer and the first queen of ancient Egypt.
- Merneith (c. 3000 BCE), consort and regent of ancient Egypt during the first dynasty. She may have been ruler of Egypt in her own right.
- Peseshet (c. 2600 BCE), a physician in Ancient Egypt.
- Puabi (c. 2600 BCE), or Shubad – queen of Ur whose tomb was discovered with many expensive artefacts. Other known pre-Sargonic queens of Ur (royal wives) include Ashusikildigir, Ninbanda, and Gansamannu.
- Kugbau (c. 2500 BCE), a taverness from Kish chosen by the Nippur priesthood to become hegemonic ruler of Sumer, and in later ages deified as "Kubaba".
- Tashlultum (c. 2400 BCE), Akkadian queen, wife of Sargon of Akkad and mother of Enheduanna.
- Baranamtarra (c. 2384 BCE), prominent and influential queen of Lugalanda of Lagash. Other known pre-Sargonic queens of the first Lagash dynasty include Menbara-abzu, Ashume'eren, Ninkhilisug, Dimtur, and Shagshag, and the names of several princesses are also known.
- Enheduanna (c. 2285 BCE), the high priestess of the temple of the Moon God in the Sumerian city-state of Ur and possibly the first known poet and first named author of either gender.
- Shibtu (c. 1775 BCE), king Zimrilim's consort and queen of the Syrian city-state of Mari. During her husband's absence, she ruled as regent of Mari and enjoyed extensive administrative powers as queen.

The glyph (♀) for the planet and Roman goddess Venus, or Aphrodite in Greek, is the symbol used to represent the female sex. In ancient alchemy, the Venus symbol stood for copper and was associated with femininity.

== Culture and gender roles ==
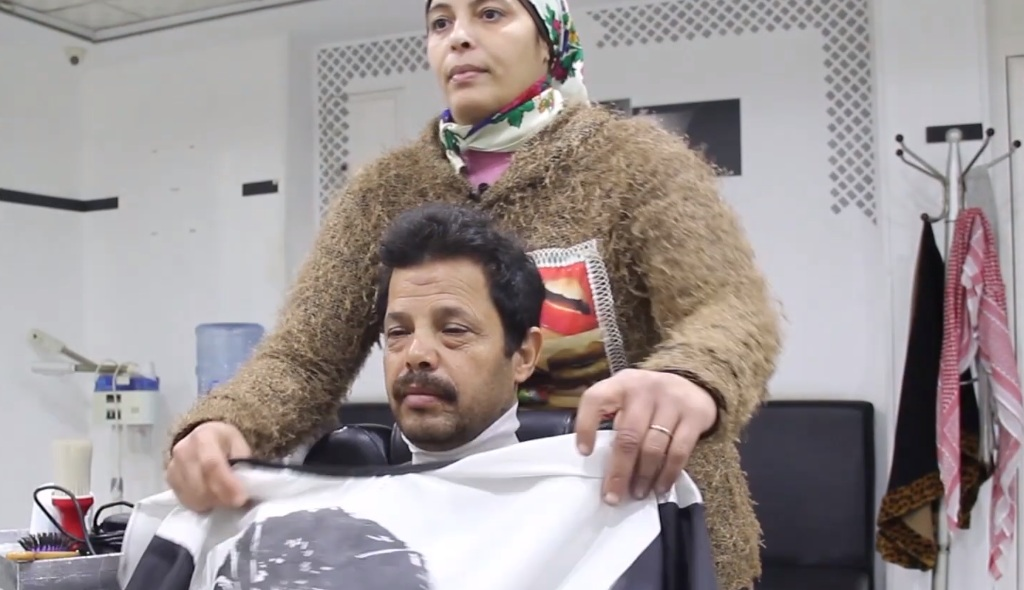
An Egyptian Muslim woman who works as a men's hairdresser to "confront the customs and traditions of her society and conquer their criticism."

In recent history, gender roles have changed greatly. At some earlier points in history, children's occupational aspirations starting at a young age differed according to gender. Traditionally, middle class women were involved in domestic tasks emphasising child care. For poorer women, economic necessity compelled them to seek employment outside the home even if individual poor women may have preferred domestic tasks. Many of the occupations that were available to them were lower in pay than those available to men.

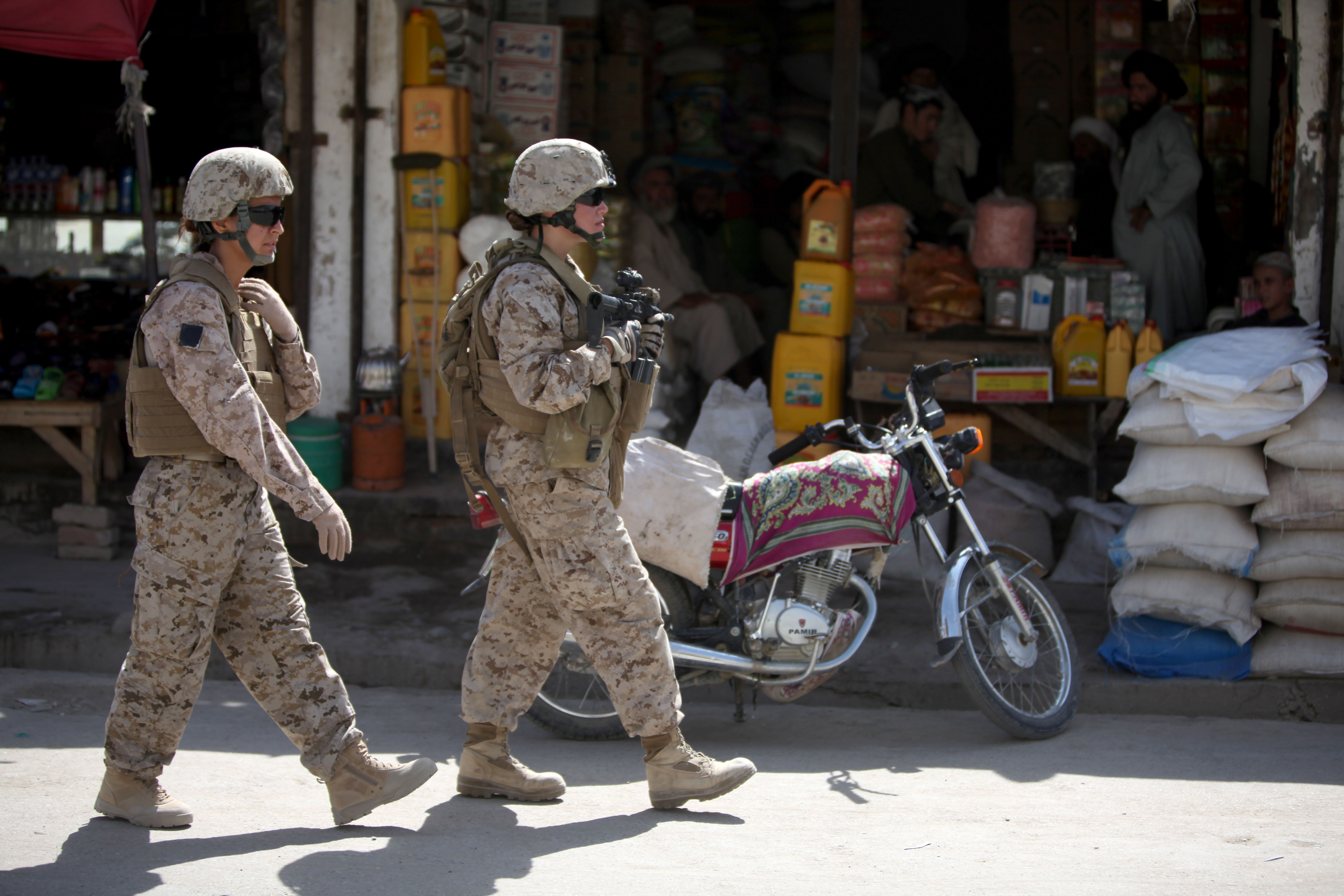
Two women U. S. Marines patrolling in Afghanistan, 2010

As changes in the labour market for women came about, availability of employment changed from only "dirty", long hour factory jobs to "cleaner", more respectable office jobs where more education was demanded. Married women's participation in the U.S. labour force rose from 5.6–6% in 1900 to 23.8% in 1923.

In the 1970s, many female academics, including scientists, avoided having children. Throughout the 1980s, institutions tried to equalise conditions for men and women in the workplace. Even so, the inequalities at home hampered women's opportunities: professional women were still generally considered responsible for domestic labour and child care, which limited the time and energy they could devote to their careers. Until the early 20th century, U.S. women's colleges required their women faculty members to remain single, on the grounds that a woman could not carry on two full-time professions at once. According to Schiebinger, "Being a scientist and a wife and a mother is a burden in society that expects women more often than men to put family ahead of career." (p. 93).

Movements advocate equality of opportunity for both sexes and equal rights irrespective of gender. Through a combination of economic changes and the efforts of the feminist movement, in recent decades women in many societies have gained access to careers beyond the traditional homemaker. Despite these advances, modern women in Western society still face challenges in the workplace as well as with the topics of education, violence, health care, politics, and motherhood, and others. Sexism can be a main concern and barrier for women almost anywhere, though its forms, perception, and gravity vary between societies and social classes. Women tend to have a stronger in-group bias than men.

The Gender Parity Index in school enrolment varies by country. The gender gaps in mathematics and reading show girls tend to have higher reading skills. The gender pay gap varies between countries and age groups.

Female intrasexual competition describes relational aggression between women, which can worsen mental health.

=== Violence against women ===
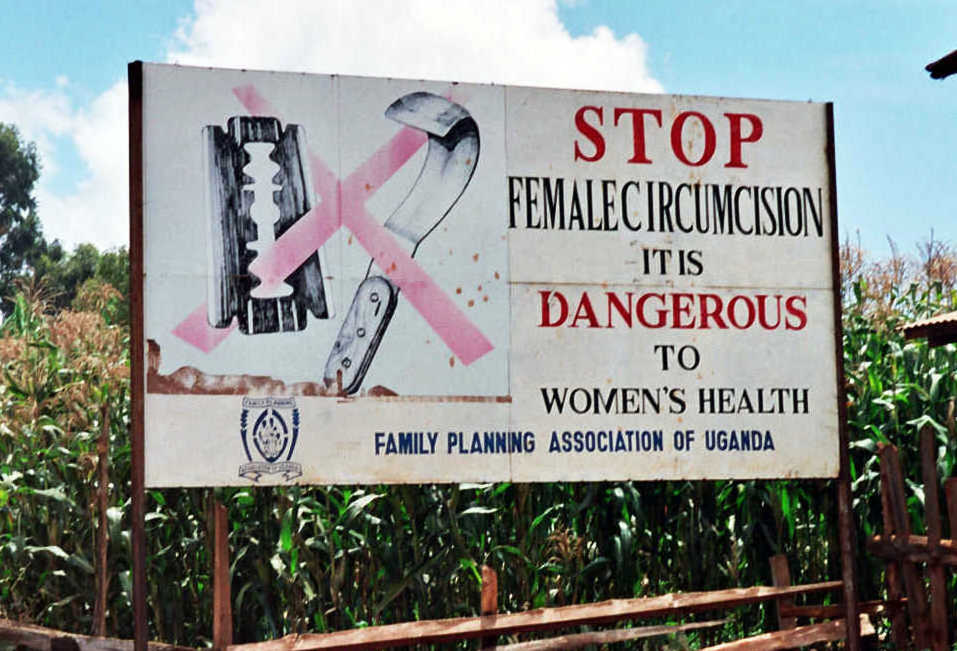
A campaign against female genital mutilation – a road sign near Kapchorwa, Uganda

The UN Declaration on the Elimination of Violence against Women defines "violence against women" as:

...any act of gender-based violence that results in, or is likely to result in, physical, sexual or mental harm or suffering to women, including threats of such acts, coercion or arbitrary deprivation of liberty, whether occurring in public or in private life.

It identifies three forms of such violence: that which occurs in the family, that which occurs within the general community, and that which is perpetrated or condoned by the State. It also states that "violence against women is a manifestation of historically unequal power relations between men and women".

Violence against women remains a widespread problem, fueled, especially outside the West, by patriarchal social values, lack of adequate laws, and lack of enforcement of existing laws. Social norms that exist in many parts of the world hinder progress towards protecting women from violence. For example, according to surveys by UNICEF, the percentage of women aged 15–49 who think that a husband is justified in hitting or beating his wife under certain circumstances is as high as 90% in Afghanistan and Jordan, 87% in Mali, 86% in Guinea and Timor-Leste, 81% in Laos, and 80% in the Central African Republic. A 2010 survey conducted by the Pew Research Center found that stoning as a punishment for adultery was supported by 82% of respondents in Egypt and Pakistan, 70% in Jordan, 56% Nigeria, and 42% in Indonesia.

Specific forms of violence that affect women include female genital mutilation, sex trafficking, forced prostitution, forced marriage, rape, sexual harassment, honour killings, acid throwing, and dowry related violence. Laws and policies on violence against women vary by jurisdiction. In the European Union, sexual harassment and human trafficking are subject to directives. Governments can be complicit in violence against women, such as when stoning is used as a legal punishment, mostly for women accused of adultery.

There have also been many forms of violence against women which have been prevalent historically, notably the burning of witches, the sacrifice of widows (such as sati) and foot binding. The prosecution of women accused of witchcraft has a long tradition; for example, during the early modern period (between the 15th and 18th centuries), witch trials were common in Europe and in the European colonies in North America. Today, there remain regions of the world (such as parts of Sub-Saharan Africa, rural North India, and Papua New Guinea) where belief in witchcraft is held by many people, and women accused of being witches are subjected to serious violence. In addition, there are also countries which have criminal legislation against the practice of witchcraft. In Saudi Arabia, witchcraft remains a crime punishable by death, and in 2011 the country beheaded a woman for 'witchcraft and sorcery'.

It is also the case that certain forms of violence against women have been recognised as criminal offences only during recent decades, and are not universally prohibited, in that many countries continue to allow them. This is especially the case with marital rape. In the Western World, there has been a trend towards ensuring gender equality within marriage and prosecuting domestic violence, but in many parts of the world women still lose significant legal rights when entering a marriage.

Sexual violence against women greatly increases during times of war and armed conflict, during military occupation, or ethnic conflicts; most often in the form of war rape and sexual slavery. Contemporary examples of sexual violence during war include rape during the Armenian genocide, rape during the Bangladesh Liberation War, rape in the Bosnian War, rape during the Rwandan genocide, and rape during Second Congo War. In Colombia, the armed conflict has also resulted in increased sexual violence against women. The most recent case was the sexual jihad done by ISIL where 5000–7000 Yazidi and Christian girls and children were sold into sexual slavery during the genocide and rape of Yazidi and Christian women, some of whom jumped to their death from Mount Sinjar, as described in a witness statement.

== Fertility and family life ==
Map of countries by fertility rate (2020), according to the Population Reference Bureau

Percentage of births to unmarried women, selected countries, 1980 and 2007

The total fertility rate (TFR) – the average number of children born to a woman over her lifetime – differs significantly between different regions of the world. In 2016, the highest estimated TFR was in Niger (6.62 children born per woman) and the lowest in Singapore (0.82 children/woman). While most Sub-Saharan African countries have a high TFR, which creates problems due to lack of resources and contributes to overpopulation, most Western countries currently experience a sub replacement fertility rate which may lead to population ageing and population decline.

In many parts of the world, there has been a change in family structure over the past few decades. For instance, in the West, there has been a trend of moving away from living arrangements that include the extended family to those which only consist of the nuclear family. There has also been a trend to move from marital fertility to non-marital fertility. Children born outside marriage may be born to cohabiting couples or to single women. While births outside marriage are common and fully accepted in some parts of the world, in other places they are highly stigmatised, with unmarried mothers facing ostracism, including violence from family members, and in extreme cases even honour killings. In addition, sex outside marriage remains illegal in many countries (such as Saudi Arabia, Pakistan, Afghanistan, Iran, Kuwait, Maldives, Morocco, Oman, Mauritania, United Arab Emirates, Sudan, and Yemen).

The social role of the mother differs between cultures. In many parts of the world, women with dependent children are expected to stay at home and dedicate all their energy to child raising, while in other places mothers most often return to paid work (see working mother and stay-at-home mother).

== Education ==
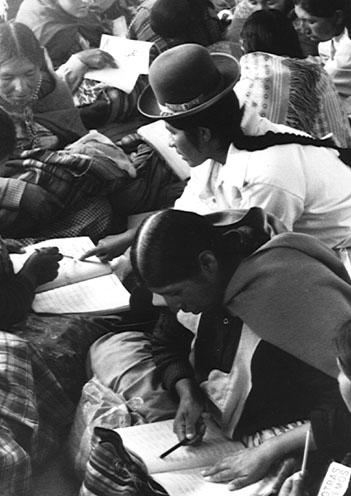
Women attending an adult literacy class in the El Alto section of La Paz, Bolivia

Single-sex education has traditionally been dominant and is still highly relevant. Universal education, meaning state-provided primary and secondary education independent of gender, is not yet a global norm, even if it is assumed in most developed countries. In some Western countries, women have surpassed men at many levels of education. For example, in the United States in 2005/2006, women earned 62% of associate degrees, 58% of bachelor's degrees, 60% of master's degrees, and 50% of doctorates.

In 2020, 87% of the world's women were literate, compared to 90% of men; at the same time, only 59% of women in sub-Saharan Africa were literate. The educational gender gap in Organisation for Economic Co-operation and Development (OECD) countries has been reduced over the last 30 years. Younger women today are far more likely to have completed a tertiary qualification: in 19 of the 30 OECD countries, more than twice as many women aged 25 to 34 have completed tertiary education than have women aged 55 to 64. In 21 of 27 OECD countries with comparable data, the number of women graduating from university-level programmes is equal to or exceeds that of men. 15-year-old girls tend to show much higher expectations for their careers than boys of the same age. While women account for more than half of university graduates in several OECD countries, they receive only 30% of tertiary degrees granted in science and engineering fields, and women account for only 25% to 35% of researchers in most OECD countries.

Research shows that while women are studying at prestigious universities at the same rate as men they are not being given the same chance to join the faculty. Sociologist Harriet Zuckerman has observed that the more prestigious an institute is, the more difficult and time-consuming it is for women to obtain a faculty position there. In 1989, Harvard University tenured its first woman in chemistry, Cynthia Friend, and in 1992 its first woman in physics, Melissa Franklin. Zuckerman also observed that women were more likely to hold their first professional positions as instructors and lecturers while men are more likely to work first in tenure positions. According to Smith and Tang, as of 1989, 65% of men and only 40% of women held tenured positions and only 29% of all scientists and engineers employed as assistant professors in four-year colleges and universities were women. Women show a drop in self-esteem in the first year of college. In the Soviet Union, 40% of chemistry PhDs went to women in the 1960s.

In 1992, women earned 9% of the PhDs awarded in engineering, but only one percent of those women became professors. In 1995, 11% of professors in science and engineering were women. In relation, only 311 deans of engineering schools were women, which is less than 1% of the total. Even in psychology, a degree in which women earn the majority of PhDs, they hold significantly fewer tenured positions, roughly 19% in 1994.

== Government and politics ==
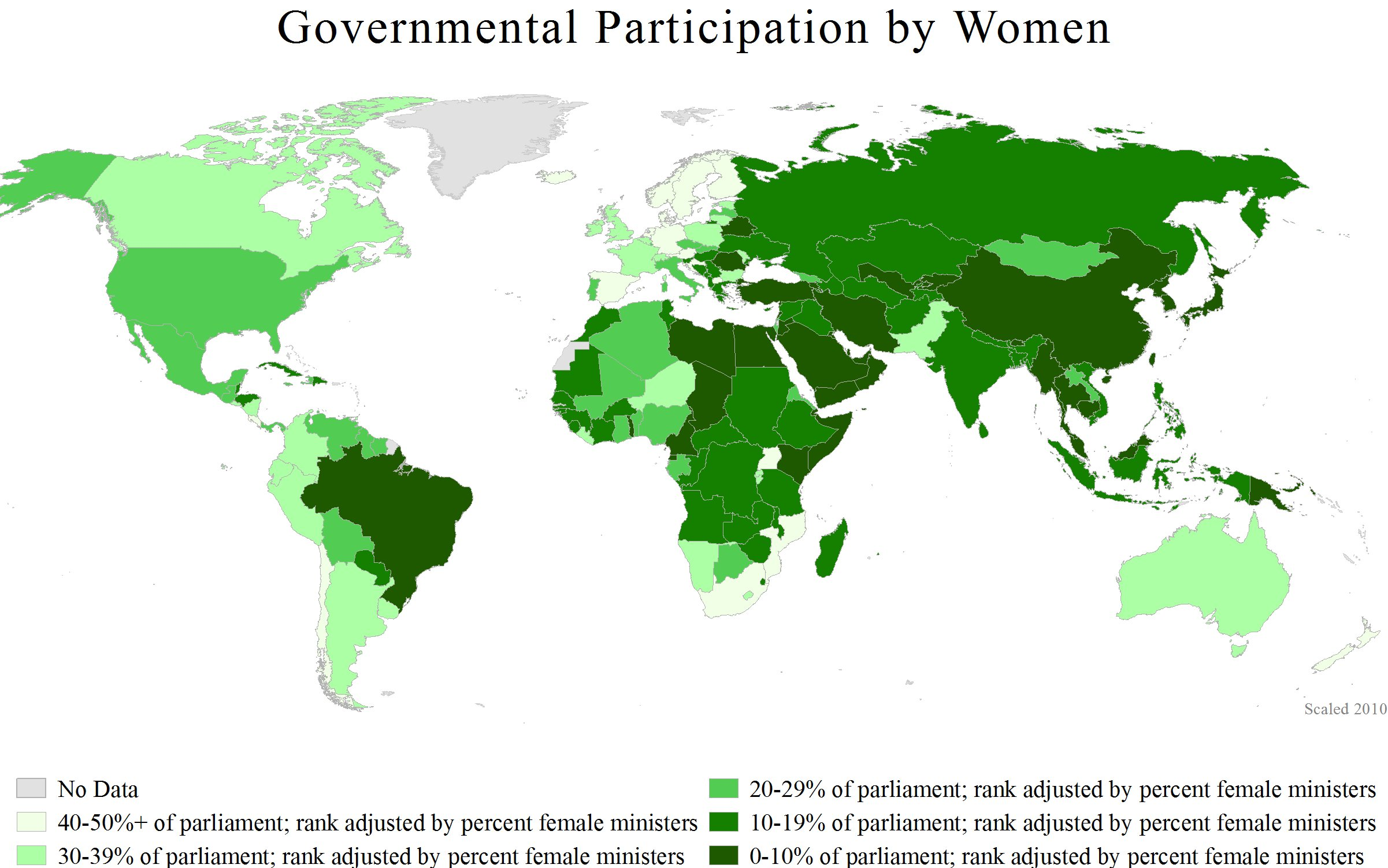
A world map showing female governmental participation by country, 2010

Women are underrepresented in government in most countries. In January 2019, the global average of women in national assemblies was 24.3%.

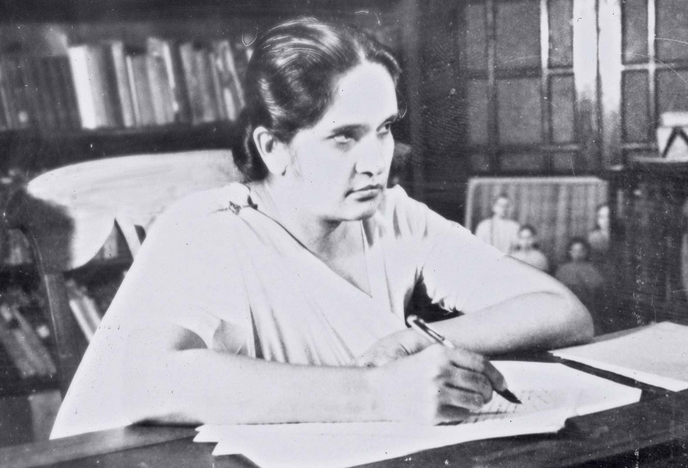
Sirimavo Bandaranaike was the first female prime minister; she was democratically elected in Sri Lanka in 1960.

Suffrage is the civil right to vote, and women's suffrage movements have a long historic timeline. As an early example, in districts of Friesland, in the Netherlands, women began voting in 1689. On the other end of the spectrum, in Kuwait women gained the right to vote in 2005, and in Saudi Arabia women gained the right to vote in 2015. Organisations that fought for women's right to vote in different countries are numerous, from Switzerland's Association internationale des femmes (which was formed in 1868) to Liechtenstein's Komitée für das Frauenstimmrecht (founded in 1969). As of 2025, the Vatican City only allows women to vote in limited lay capacity, and other countries such as Afghanistan lack functional democracies entirely.

== Science, literature and art ==
=== Science and medicine ===
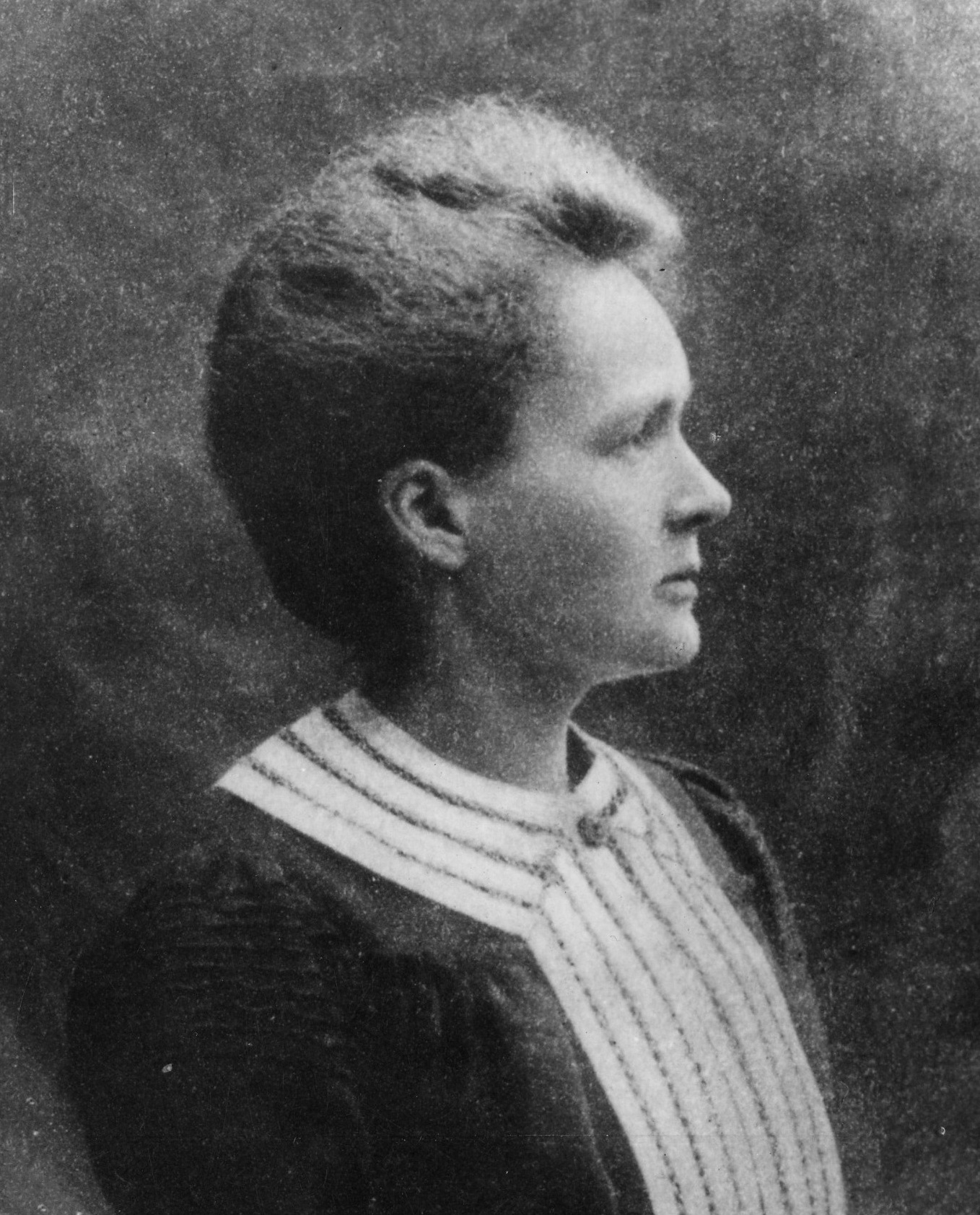
Chemist and physicist Marie Curie was the first woman to be awarded a Nobel Prize, and the only person to win a Nobel Prize in two different scientific fields.

Women have historically had access to practice midwifery, obstetrics and gynaecology. In Europe, prior to the 18th century, caring for pregnant women was undertaken by other women. However, from the mid-18th century onwards, society began to require rigorous formal education to practice medicine. Since women were prohibited from higher education, women's reproductive healthcare was transferred to male practitioners.

Early women in other scientific fields include Hypatia (b. 350-370 CE), a mathematician and astronomer who edited the Almagest.

=== Literature ===
The earliest author known by name was an Akkadian woman named Enheduanna, who wrote in the 23rd century BCE. Ghosha, an Indian composer of hymns in the Rigveda, was active around 1500–900 BCE. The first recorded female Chinese poet was Duchess Mu of Xu, who wrote in the 7th century BCE. The Tale of Genji, one of the earliest novel-like works and sometimes called "the first novel", was written by the Japanese Murasaki Shikibu in the 11th century CE.

In Western society, writing was generally considered acceptable for upper-class women. However, achieving success as a female writer in a male-dominated world could be very difficult; as a result, some women writers adopted male pen names (e.g. George Sand, George Eliot, Currer Bell, Ellis Bell, Acton Bell, and Vernon Lee). This has continued into more modern times, with 20th-century writers such as Andre Norton and James Tiptree Jr adopting male pseudonyms, and some authors such as J.K. Rowling and Harper Lee adopting purposefully unisex pen names.

=== Music ===
Women have been composers, songwriters, instrumental performers, singers, conductors, music scholars, music educators, music critics/music journalists and other musical professions. There are music movements, events and genres related to women, women's issues and feminism. In the 2010s, while women comprise a significant proportion of popular music and classical music singers, and a significant proportion of songwriters (many of them being singer-songwriters), there are few women record producers, rock critics and rock instrumentalists. Although there have been a huge number of women composers in classical music, from the Medieval period to the present day, women composers are significantly underrepresented in the commonly performed classical music repertoire, music history textbooks and music encyclopaedias; for example, in the Concise Oxford History of Music, Clara Schumann is one of the only female composers who is mentioned.

Women comprise a significant proportion of instrumental soloists in classical music and the percentage of women in orchestras is increasing. A 2015 article on concerto soloists in major Canadian orchestras, however, indicated that 84% of the soloists with the Montreal Symphony Orchestra were men. In 2012, women still made up just 6% of the top-ranked Vienna Philharmonic orchestra. Women are less common as instrumental players in popular music genres such as rock and heavy metal, although there have been a number of notable female instrumentalists and all-female bands. Women are particularly underrepresented in extreme metal genres. Women are also underrepresented in orchestral conducting, music criticism/music journalism, music producing, and sound engineering. While women were discouraged from composing in the 19th century, and there are few women musicologists, women became involved in music education "... to such a degree that women dominated [this field] during the later half of the 19th century and well into the 20th century."

According to Jessica Duchen, a music writer for London's The Independent, women musicians in classical music are "... too often judged for their appearances, rather than their talent" and they face pressure "... to look sexy onstage and in photos." Duchen states that while "[t]here are women musicians who refuse to play on their looks, ... the ones who do tend to be more materially successful."

According to the UK's Radio 3 editor, Edwina Wolstencroft, the classical music industry has long been open to having women in performance or entertainment roles, but women are much less likely to have positions of authority, such as being the leader of an orchestra. In popular music, while there are many women singers recording songs, there are very few women behind the audio console acting as music producers, the individuals who direct and manage the recording process.

== See also ==
General
- Lists of women
- UN Women

Sociological:

- Women's studies
Dynamics:
- Feminization (sociology)
- Matriarchy
Medical:
- Feminine psychology
Other:
- Womyn / Womxn

== Sources ==
This article incorporates text from a free content work. Licensed under CC BY 4.0 (license statement/permission). Text taken from The State of Food Security and Nutrition in the World 2026, Food and Agriculture Organization of the United Nations.
