= Milton Diamond =

American sexologist (1934–2024)

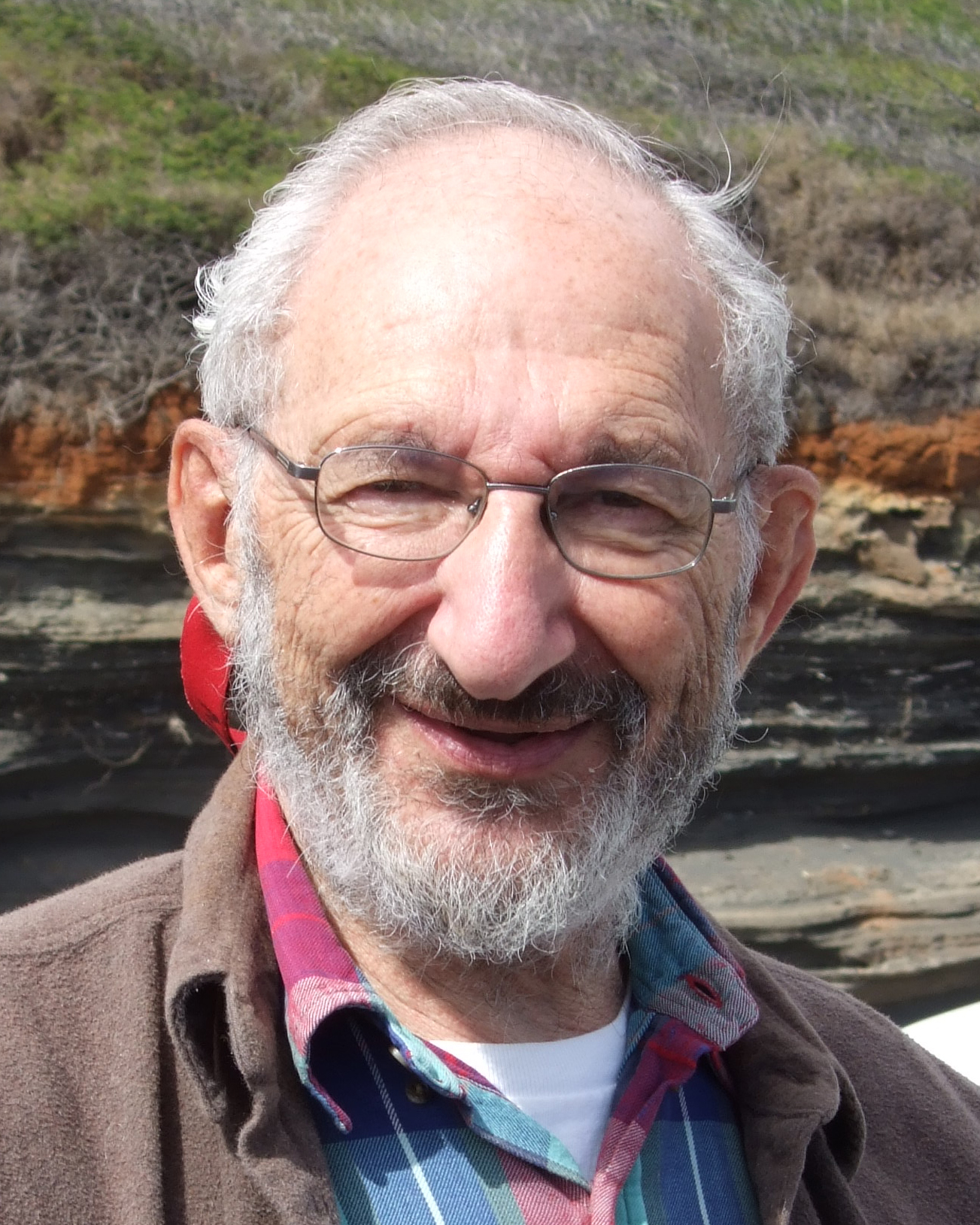
- Diamond in 2010
- Born: March 6, 1934; New York City, U.S.
- Died: March 20, 2024 (aged 90); Honolulu, Hawai'i, U.S.
- Education: City College of New York (BS); University of Kansas (PhD)
- Known for: Following up the case of David Reimer
- Scientific career
- Fields: The study of human sexuality
- Workplaces: University of Hawaiʻi at Mānoa

Milton Diamond (March 6, 1934 – March 20, 2024) was an American professor of anatomy and reproductive biology at the University of Hawaiʻi at Mānoa. After a career in the study of human sexuality, Diamond retired from the university in December 2009 but continued with his research and writing until retiring fully in 2018. He died on March 20, 2024, at the age of 90.

== Early career ==
Milton Diamond graduated from the City College of New York with a BS in biophysics in 1955, after which he spent three years in the Army as an engineering officer, stationed in Japan. On returning to the United States, he attended graduate school at University of Kansas from 1958 to 1962 where he earned a PhD in anatomy and psychology. His first job was teaching at the University of Louisville, School of Medicine where he simultaneously completed two years toward a Doctor of Medicine, passing his Basic Medicine Boards, and in 1967 he moved to Hawaii to take up a post at the recently established John A. Burns School of Medicine.

Milton Diamond had a long running feud with the psychologist Dr. John Money. In 1965 Diamond published A Critical Evaluation of the Ontogeny of Human Sexual Behavior, a critique of Money's work. In the early seventies, Diamond and Money were attending a conference on transgenderism in Dubrovnik. According to the book As Nature Made Him: The Boy Who Was Raised as a Girl (page 174), at this conference Money initiated a loud and aggressive argument with Diamond. Eyewitnesses claimed Money punched Diamond; however, Diamond himself said that he could not recall any physical contact during this encounter.

== David Reimer ==
Diamond was best known for following up on the case of David Reimer, a boy raised as a girl under the supervision of John Money after his penis was damaged beyond surgical repair during a botched circumcision, which was performed using an unconventional method of electrocauterization instead of a clamp and scalpel. This case, which Money renamed that of "John/Joan" to protect Reimer's privacy, has become one of the most cited cases in the literature of psychiatry, anthropology, women's studies, child development, and biology of gender. With the cooperation of H. Keith Sigmundson, who had been Reimer's supervising psychiatrist, Diamond tracked down the adult Reimer and found that Money's sex reassignment of Reimer had failed. Diamond was the first to alert physicians that the model, proposed by Reimer's case, of how to treat infants with intersex conditions was faulty.

Diamond recommended that physicians should not perform surgery on intersex people without their informed consent, should assign such infants to the gender to which they will probably best adjust, and refrain from adding shame, stigma and secrecy to the issue, by assisting intersex people to meet and associate with others of like condition. Diamond similarly encouraged considering the intersex condition as a difference of sex development, not as a disorder.

== Work, appointments and awards ==
Diamond wrote extensively about abortion and family planning, pornography, intersexuality, transsexuality, and other sex- and reproduction-related issues for sex-related scientific journals as well as legal journals. He also wrote for lay periodicals. He was frequently interviewed for public media and legal matters, and often served as an expert in court proceedings, and was known for his research on the origins and development of sexual identity. He retired from teaching in 2009, but continued to research and consult concerning transsexuality, intersexuality and pornography until he retired fully in 2018.

=== Appointments ===
Diamond was based at the John A. Burns School of Medicine at the University of Hawaiʻi at Mānoa, from 1967. He was appointed Professor of Anatomy and Reproductive Biology in 1971, and from 1985 until his retirement he was Director of the Pacific Center for Sex and Society within the School of Medicine.

In 1999 Diamond was appointed President of the International Academy of Sex Research, and in 2001/02 President of the Society for the Scientific Study of Sexuality.

=== Awards ===
The awards Diamond received include:

- 1999: the British GIRES Research Prize
- 2000: the German Magnus Hirschfeld Medal for sexual science
- 2005: the Norwegian Diversity Prize for his research efforts on behalf of transsexual and transgender people worldwide
- 2008: the first of a proposed annual award made by the German Intersex Society (Intersexuelle Menschen e.V.) "for his decades-long commitment to the benefit of intersex people";
- 2009: the Regents' Medal for Excellence in Research by the University of Hawaiʻi;
- 2010: the Kinsey Award for 2011, made by the Midcontinent Region of the Society for the Scientific Study of Sexuality.
- 2015: the World Association for Sexual Health gold medal
- 2025: Posthumously awarded by InterACT: the 2024 Anne Tamar-Mattis Advocacy Award.

== Selected publications ==
- Diamond, Milton; Karlen, Arno (1980). Sexual Decisions. Boston: Little, Brown. ISBN 978-0-316-18388-8. OCLC 607164700 – via Internet Archive.
- Sexwatching: Looking into the World of Sexual Behaviour. London: Prion. 1992 [1984]. ISBN 978-1-85375-024-3. OCLC 1285752977 – via Internet Archive.
- "Sexual Behavior in Pre-contact Hawai'i". Revista Española del Pacifico (16): 37–58. 2004 – via University of Hawaii System.
