= As Nature Made Him =

2000 biography of David Reimer by John Colapinto

As Nature Made Him: The Boy Who Was Raised as a Girl
- Author: John Colapinto
- Publisher: Harper Perennial
- Publication date: February 20, 2000
- Pages: 279
- ISBN: 978-0-06-019211-2

As Nature Made Him: The Boy Who Was Raised as a Girl is a biography of David Reimer, written by John Colapinto and published February 20, 2000, by Harper Perennial. Reimer was a Canadian man born male but raised as a girl after his penis was severely injured during a botched circumcision in infancy and John Money advised his parents to follow the optimum gender rearing model. Money published his research regarding Reimer as the "Joan/John case", comparing him to his twin brother. Reimer's identity became public with the publication of his biography. Half of the author's earnings from the book were forwarded to Reimer.

== Reception ==
In 2001, As Nature Made Him was a finalist for the Lambda Literary Award for Transgender Literature. The book was also a New York Times best seller.

== See also ==
- Sexing the Body
