= Transsexualism and Sex Reassignment =

1969 book by Richard Green and John Money

- Editors: Richard Green and John Money
- Language: English
- Subject: Gender dysphoria, Transgender people
- Published: Baltimore
- Publisher: Johns Hopkins University Press
- Publication date: 1969
- Publication place: United States
- Media type: Print (hardcover)
- Pages: 512
- ISBN: 978-0-801-81038-1
- OCLC: 644381170

Transsexualism and Sex Reassignment is a book on gender dysphoria which was edited by sexologists Richard Green and John Money and was published by Johns Hopkins University Press in 1969. It was the first medical textbook to be published on transgender people. The book contained a chapter on hormone replacement therapy written by Christian Hamburger and included an appendix with additional treatment suggestions and guidelines by Harry Benjamin.
