= Undone (Colapinto novel) =

2015 novel by John Colapinto

Undone: A Novel
- First edition
- Author: John Colapinto
- Language: English
- Genre: Genre fiction
- Published: 2015
- Publisher: Patrick Crean editions (2015); Soft Skull Press (2016)

Undone: A Novel is a 2015 novel written by The New Yorker staff writer John Colapinto.

== Plot ==
A man with a fetish for teenage girls, Dez, hatches a greedy scheme to have his latest young conquest pose as the lost daughter of a morally upright famous author and seduce him.

== Reception ==
Colapinto has admitted that the book was rejected by 41 publishers.

According to Lisan Jutras, writing in The Globe and Mail, Colapinto's "pacing suddenly jolts into fast-forward for the last 100 pages, which are whipped through so quickly and in such broad strokes that both violence and justice are reduced almost to parody. The sentimentality of the story also seems highlighted as a result. Yet it's hard to tell if he is sending up the sentimentality or indulging in it. Unlike [Francine] Prose or [Philip] Roth's books [Blue Angel and American Pastoral respectively], Colapinto's never quite transcends being genre fiction, by which I mean, not only does the work thrill more than convince, it also feels as if the Big Question at its heart is unclear. Genre fiction is fine, but when the writer deals in such volatile subject matter, you hope the writer's got a damn good reason for it."
