= The Star Turn =

- Directed by: Nelu Ghiran
- Written by: John Colapinto
- Produced by: Donald Booth
- Starring: Nigel Bennett; Joe-Norman Shaw
- Cinematography: Gerald Packer
- Release date: 1990
- Running time: 13 minutes
- Country: Canada
- Language: English

The Star Turn is a Canadian drama short film, directed by Nelu Ghiran and released in 1990. Based in part on the sex scandal that derailed Gary Hart's presidential campaign in 1988, the film stars Nigel Bennett and Joe-Norman Shaw as Geoffrey and Simon, two journalists who are trying to land a big scoop by staking out a philandering politician outside his motel room.

The screenplay was written by journalist John Colapinto.

The film was a Genie Award nominee for Best Theatrical Short Film at the 12th Genie Awards in 1991.
