= David Reimer =

Canadian man raised as a girl (1965–2004)

- Born: Bruce Peter Reimer; 22 August 1965; Winnipeg, Manitoba, Canada
- Died: 4 May 2004 (aged 38); Winnipeg, Manitoba, Canada
- Cause of death: Suicide by gunshot
- Resting place: St. Vital Cemetery, Winnipeg
- Other name: Brenda Reimer
- Spouse: Jane Fontane (m. 1990)

David Reimer (born Bruce Peter Reimer; 22 August 1965 – 4 May 2004) was a Canadian man raised as a girl following medical advice and intervention after his penis was severely injured during a botched circumcision in infancy.

The psychologist John Money oversaw the case and incorrectly reported the reassignment as successful and as evidence supporting the idea gender identity is primarily learned. Academic sexologist Milton Diamond later reported how Reimer's realization he was not a girl occurred between the ages of 9 and 11 years, and he was living as a male by the age of 15. Diamond also co-authored a paper that indicated Money almost certainly had overlooked or misinterpreted evidence that contradicted his thesis. Psychiatrist H. Keith Sigmundson made the more forceful claim Money engaged in "fraudulent misrepresentation of all the facts"

Well-known in medical circles for years anonymously as the "John/Joan" case, Reimer later went public with his story to help discourage similar medical practices. He killed himself at age 38, two days after separating from his wife.

== Life ==
=== Infancy ===
David Reimer was born in Winnipeg, Manitoba, on 22 August 1965. David was the elder twin boy. He was originally named Bruce, and his identical twin was named Brian. Their parents were Janet and Ron Reimer, a couple of Mennonite descent who had married in December 1964. At the age of six months, after concern was raised about how both of them urinated, the boys were diagnosed with phimosis. They were referred for circumcision at the age of seven months. General practitioner Jean-Marie Huot performed the operation using the unconventional method of electrocauterization, but the procedure burned David's penis beyond surgical repair. The doctors did not operate on Brian, whose phimosis later cleared without surgical intervention.

The parents, concerned about their son's prospects for future happiness and sexual function without a penis, took him to Johns Hopkins Hospital in Baltimore in early 1967 to see John Money, a psychologist who was developing a reputation as a pioneer in the field of sexual development and gender identity, based on his work with intersex patients. Money was a prominent proponent of the "theory of gender neutrality"—that gender identity developed primarily as a result of social learning from early childhood and that it could be changed with the appropriate behavioural interventions. The Reimers had seen Money being interviewed in February 1967 on the Canadian news program This Hour Has Seven Days, during which he discussed his theories about gender.

At that time, surgical construction of the vagina was more advanced than construction of the penis, and Money believed that Reimer would be happiest in adulthood living as a woman with functioning genitalia.

Money and the Hopkins family team persuaded the baby's parents that sex reassignment surgery would be in Reimer's best interest. At the age of 22 months, David underwent a bilateral orchiectomy, in which his testes were surgically removed and a rudimentary vulva was constructed by genital plastic surgery. David was reassigned to be raised as female and given the name Brenda (similar to his birth name, Bruce). Psychological support for the reassignment and surgery was provided by John Money, who continued to see Reimer annually for consultations and to assess the outcome. This reassignment was considered an especially important test case of the social learning concept of gender identity for two reasons: first, Reimer's identical twin brother, Brian, made an ideal control because the brothers shared genes, family environments, and the intrauterine environment; second, this was reputed to be the first reassignment and reconstruction performed on a male infant who had no abnormality of prenatal or early postnatal sexual differentiation.

=== Forced "sexual rehearsal" ===
Money reported on Reimer's progress as the "John/Joan case", describing apparently successful female gender development, even after David informed his father at age 14 that he had always felt that he was a boy, bringing the experiment to an end.

According to John Colapinto, who published a biography of Reimer in 2001, the sessions with Money included what Money called "childhood sexual rehearsal play". Money theorized that reproductive behaviour formed the foundation of gender, and that "play at thrusting movements and copulation" was a key aspect of gender development in all primates. Starting at age six, according to Brian, the twins were forced to act out sexual acts, with David playing the female role—Money made David get down on all fours, and Brian was forced to "come up behind [him] and place his crotch against [his] buttocks". Money also forced David, in another sexual position, to have his "legs spread" with Brian on top. On "at least one occasion" Money took a photograph of the two children doing these activities.

When either child resisted these activities, Money would get angry. Both David and Brian recall that Money was mild-mannered around their parents, but ill-tempered when alone with them. When they resisted inspecting each other's genitals, Money got very aggressive. David says, "He told me to take my clothes off, and I just did not do it. I just stood there. And he screamed, 'Now!' Louder than that. I thought he was going to give me a whupping. So I took my clothes off and stood there shaking."

Money's rationale for these various treatments was his belief that "childhood 'sexual rehearsal play'" was important for a "healthy adult gender identity".

Both David and Brian were traumatized with Brian speaking about it "only with the greatest emotional turmoil", and David unwilling to speak about the details publicly, although his wife, Jane Fontane, stated that David had privately told her the same story.

=== Puberty and adolescence ===
Estrogen was given to David during adolescence, therefore inducing breast development.

Money wrote, "The child's behavior is so clearly that of an active little girl and so different from the boyish ways of her twin brother."

The twins attended Glenwood School in Winnipeg, and from the age of 14, David attended R.B. Russell Vocational High School. He eventually ceased attending the school and was tutored privately.

By the age of 13 years, Reimer was experiencing suicidal depression and he told his parents he would take his own life if they made him see Money again. Finally, on 14 March 1980, Reimer's parents told him the truth about his sex reassignment, following advice from Reimer's endocrinologist and psychiatrist. At the age of 14, having been informed of his past by his father, Reimer decided to assume a male gender identity, calling himself David. He underwent treatment to reverse the reassignment, including testosterone injections, a double mastectomy, and phalloplasty operations.

=== Adulthood ===
Reimer worked in a slaughterhouse and then worked odd jobs. On 22 September 1990, he married Jane Fontane and would adopt her three children. His hobbies included camping, fishing, antiques and collecting old coins.

His case came to international attention in 1997 when he told his story to Milton Diamond, an academic sexologist who persuaded Reimer to allow him to report the outcome in order to dissuade physicians from treating other infants similarly. Soon after, Reimer went public with his story and John Colapinto published a widely disseminated and influential account in Rolling Stone magazine in December 1997. The article won the National Magazine Award for Reporting.

This was later expanded into The New York Times best-selling biography As Nature Made Him: The Boy Who Was Raised as a Girl (2000), in which Colapinto described how—contrary to Money's reports—when living as Brenda, Reimer did not identify as a girl. He was ostracized and bullied by peers (who dubbed him "cavewoman"), and neither frilly dresses nor female hormones made him feel female.

=== Death ===
In 2004, Reimer was grieving over the 2002 death of his twin brother. Brian Reimer had intentionally overdosed on psychiatric medication, and David Reimer visited his grave every day. He had recently lost his job, had lost $65,000 in investments, and had separated from his wife. On the morning of 4 May 2004, Reimer killed himself with a shotgun in his hometown of Winnipeg. He was 38 years old. He and Brian are buried in St. Vital Cemetery in Winnipeg.

Money never commented publicly on Colapinto's book or on Reimer's suicide, although colleagues said he was "mortified" by the case.

== Legacy ==
For the first 30 years after Money's initial report that the reassignment had been a success, Money's view of the malleability of gender became the dominant viewpoint in the field, reassuring practitioners that sexual reassignment of infants was the correct decision in certain instances. Money claimed the success of Reimer's gender transition as support for the optimum gender rearing model for intersex children. Researcher Mary Anne Case argues that Money's view on gender also fuelled the rise of the anti-gender movement.

Diamond's report and John Colapinto's subsequent book about Reimer influenced several medical practices, reputations, and even current understanding of the biology of gender. The case accelerated the decline of sex reassignment and surgery for unambiguous XY infants with micropenis, various other rare congenital malformations, or penile loss in infancy.

Colapinto's book described unethical and traumatic childhood therapy sessions and implied that Money had ignored or concealed the developing evidence that Reimer's reassignment to female was not going well.

== Documentaries ==
The BBC science series Horizon based two episodes on Reimer's life: "The Boy Who Was Turned into a Girl" aired in 2000 and "Dr Money and the Boy with No Penis" in 2004.

A 2001 episode of the PBS documentary series Nova entitled "Sex: Unknown" investigated David's life and the theory behind the decision to raise him as female.

A 2010 episode of BBC Radio 4 Mind Changers, "Case Study: John/Joan—The Boy Who Was Raised as a Girl", discusses the impact on two competing psychological theories of nature vs. nurture.

Archival footage of Reimer and his story was included in the 2023 documentary about intersexuality, Every Body.

Reimer's story was included in chapter 11 of American author Sam Kean's 2021 nonfiction book The Icepick Surgeon, which chronicles many instances of scientific and medical malpractice over time.

== In popular culture ==
- The Chicago Hope episode "Boys Will Be Girls" (2000) was based on Reimer's life. The episode explored the theme of a child's right not to undergo sex reassignment surgery without consent.
- Reimer and his mother appeared on an episode of The Oprah Winfrey Show in 2000.
- The NYPD Blue episode "Dress for Success" (aired 2004, season 12, episode 1) features a fictional character with many similarities to Reimer. The character was injured during circumcision, raised as a girl, and ultimately transitioned again to live as a man.
- The Law & Order: Special Victims Unit episode "Identity" (2005) was based on David and Brian Reimer's lives and their treatment by Money.
- "Hymn of the Medical Oddity", a song by the Winnipeg-based indie rock band The Weakerthans, concerns Reimer.
- Boy (2016), a play produced by the Ensemble Studio Theatre, was inspired by Reimer's story.
- Taiwanese film Born to be Human (2021) shares a similar plotline to Reimer's story, where a child undergoes sexual reassignment surgery without consent at the insistence of an authoritative doctor.

== See also ==
- Herculine Barbin
- Genital modification and mutilation
- History of intersex surgery
- Nature versus nurture
- Penectomy
- Eunuch
