= Sex assignment =

Process of discerning sex at birth

Sex assignment or gender assignment (Note: See differences in sex and gender) is the discernment of an infant's sex, typically made at birth based on an examination of the newborn's external genitalia by a healthcare provider such as a midwife, nurse, or physician. In the vast majority of cases (99.95%), sex is assigned unambiguously at birth. However, in about 1 in 2000 births, the baby's genitals may not clearly appear male or female, necessitating additional diagnostic steps, and deferring sex assignment. In most countries, healthcare providers submit a record of the infant's assigned sex and other details of the birth to the government for later issuance of a birth certificate and for other legal purposes.

The prevalence of intersex conditions, where a baby's sex characteristics do not conform strictly to typical definitions of male or female, ranges between 0.018% and 1.7%. While some intersex conditions result in genital ambiguity (approximately 0.02% to 0.05% of births), others present genitalia that are distinctly male or female, which may delay the recognition of an intersex condition until later in life. When assigning sex to intersex individuals, some healthcare providers may consider the gender identity that most people with a similar intersex condition eventually develop, although such assignments may be revised as the individual matures.

The use of surgical or hormonal interventions to reinforce sex assignments in intersex individuals without informed consent is considered a violation of human rights, according to the Office of the United Nations High Commissioner for Human Rights.

Societally and medically, it is generally assumed that a person's gender identity will align with their assigned sex, making them cisgender. However, for a minority, assigned sex and gender identity do not coincide, leading to transgender identity experiences.

== Terminology ==
Sex assignment refers to the identification of an infant's sex at birth, typically based on observable physical characteristics. This is also known as gender assignment.

In clinical and medical contexts, terms such as "birth-assigned sex" or "birth-assigned gender" are used to describe the sex identified at birth, or sex assigned at birth, or SAAB, while "assigned sex" and "assigned gender" may also refer to any subsequent reassignments, especially common among intersex individuals.

The terminology has evolved across various editions of the Diagnostic and Statistical Manual of Mental Disorders (DSM) maintained by the American Psychiatric Association. Initially, the third edition of the DSM referred to "anatomic sex". By the fourth edition in 1994, the term "assigned sex" was introduced, with subsequent editions also using "biological sex" and "natal gender". The latest revision in 2022 streamlined the language to consistently use "sex assignment".

A 2006 consensus statement on intersex conditions also adopted the terms "assigned sex" and "assigned gender". Sex is assigned as either male or female, leading to specific terms:

Assigned female at birth
A person of any age and irrespective of current gender whose sex was assigned as female at birth. Often shortened to AFAB. Synonyms include female assigned at birth (FAAB) and designated female at birth (DFAB).
Assigned male at birth
A person of any age and irrespective of current gender whose sex was assigned as male at birth. Often shortened to AMAB. Synonyms include male assigned at birth (MAAB) and designated male at birth (DMAB).
Assigned gender at birth
Assigned gender at birth. Sometimes shortened to AGAB.

More visible adoption of the terminology of sex assignment has led to public debate and criticism.

There is a consensus in the use of the term "sex assignment" for newborns with intersex conditions; observed chromosomal sex and assigned sex may intentionally differ for medical reasons (based upon predictions of psychosocial and psychosexual health in later life).

== Assignment in cases of infants with intersex traits, or cases of trauma ==
Observation or recognition of an infant's sex may be complicated in the case of intersex infants and children and in cases of early trauma. In such cases, the infant may be assigned male or female, and may receive intersex surgery to confirm that assignment. These medical interventions have increasingly been seen as a human rights violation due to their unnecessary nature and the potential for lifelong complications.

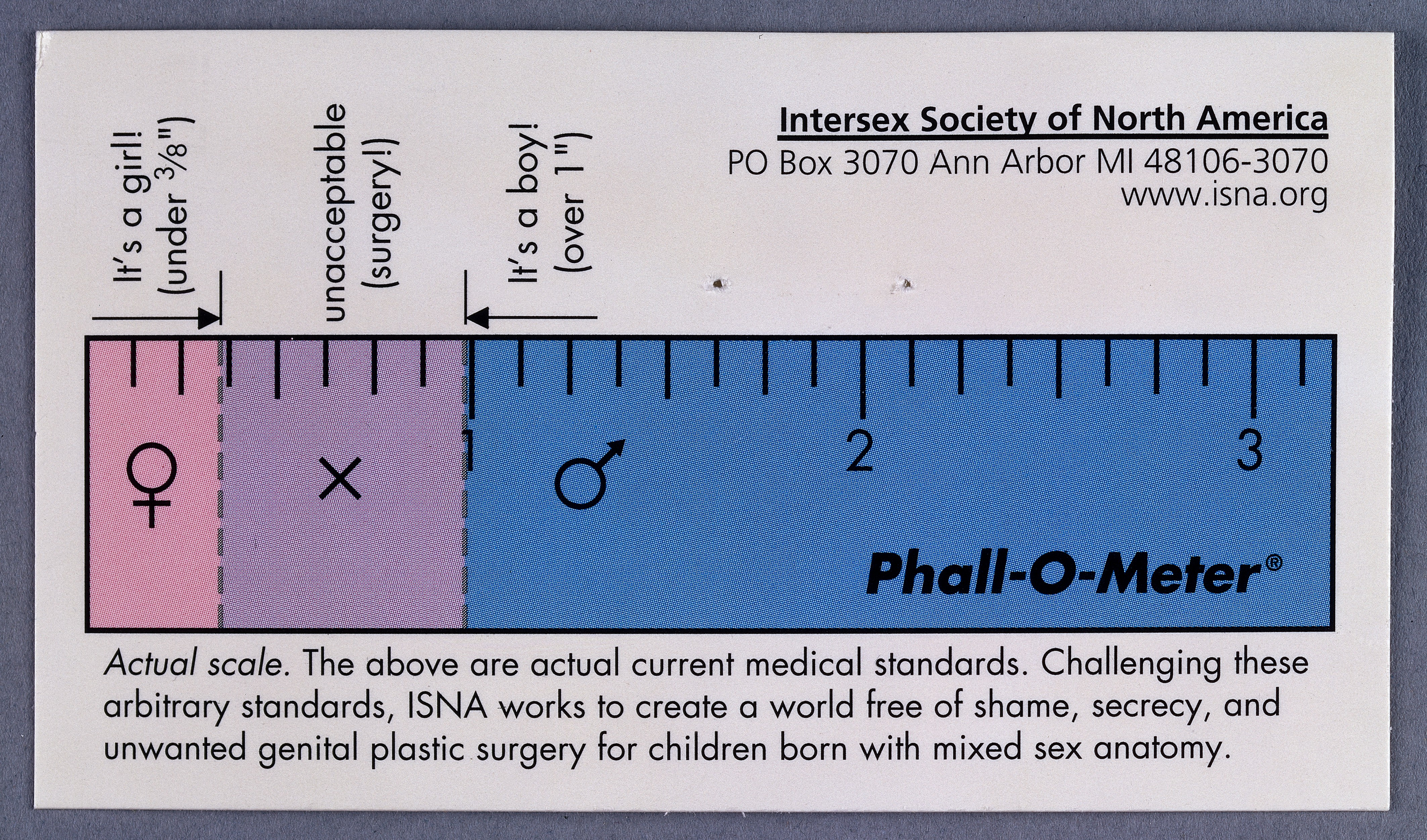
The Phall-O-Meter satirizes clinical assessments of appropriate clitoris and penis length at birth, and the definition of ambiguous genitalia. It is based on research published by Suzanne Kessler.

Cases of trauma include the famous John/Joan case, where sexologist John Money claimed successful reassignment from male to female of a 17-month-old boy whose penis was destroyed during circumcision. However, this claim was later shown to be largely false. The subject, David Reimer, later identified as a man.

The number of births with ambiguous genitals is in the range of 1 in 2,000 to 1 in 4,500 (0.05% to 0.02%). Typical examples would be an unusually prominent clitoris in an otherwise apparently typical girl, or complete cryptorchidism in an otherwise apparently typical boy. In most of these cases, a sex is tentatively assigned and the parents told that tests will be performed to confirm the apparent sex. Typical tests in this situation might include a pelvic ultrasound to determine the presence of a uterus, a testosterone or 17α-hydroxyprogesterone level, and/or a karyotype. In some of these cases a pediatric endocrinologist is consulted to confirm the tentative sex assignment. The expected assignment is usually confirmed within hours to a few days in these cases.

Some infants are born with enough ambiguity that assignment becomes a more drawn-out process of multiple tests and intensive education of the parents about sexual differentiation. In some of these cases, it is clear that the child will face physical difficulties or social stigma as they grow up, and deciding upon the sex of assignment involves weighing the advantages and disadvantages of either assignment. Intersex activists have criticised "normalising" procedures performed on infants and children, who are unable to provide informed consent.

=== History ===
In European societies, Roman law, post-classical canon law, and later common law, referred to a person's sex as male, female, or "hermaphrodite", with legal rights as male or female depending on the characteristics that appeared most dominant. Under Roman law, a hermaphrodite had to be classed as either male or female. The 12th-century Decretum Gratiani states that "Whether a hermaphrodite may witness a testament, depends on which sex prevails". The foundation of common law, the 16th century Institutes of the Lawes of England, described how a hermaphrodite could inherit "either as male or female, according to that kind of sexe which doth prevaile".

Legal cases where sex assignment was placed in doubt have been described over the centuries. Research suggests that within early modern common law, particularly in England and colonial America during the seventeenth and eighteenth centuries, such cases were treated as matters of legal determination rather than medical diagnosis, and were resolved through evidentiary procedures in court. Rather than applying a fixed biological standard, courts considered a range of physical, behavioral, and social factors when assigning sex, without sharply distinguishing between what would later be conceptualized as "sex" and "gender." Decisions were typically based on testimony and social context, reflecting the broader common law tradition of relying on juries and community knowledge in fact-finding. Toward the late eighteenth century, with the medicalization of intersexuality, medical and scientific authorities began to play a more central role in such determinations, marking the beginning of a shift toward the modern view of sex as a biological and binary category.

Before the 1950s, assignment was based almost entirely on the appearance of the external genitalia. Although physicians recognized that there were conditions in which the apparent secondary sexual characteristics could develop contrary to the person's sex, and conditions in which the gonadal sex did not match that of the external genitalia, their ability to understand and diagnose such conditions in infancy was too poor to attempt to predict future development in most cases. In the 1950s, endocrinologists developed a basic understanding of the major intersex conditions such as congenital adrenal hyperplasia (CAH), androgen insensitivity syndrome, and mixed gonadal dysgenesis. The discovery of cortisone allowed survival of infants with severe CAH for the first time. New hormone tests and karyotypes allowed more confident diagnosis in infancy and prediction of future development.

Sex assignment became more than choosing a sex of rearing, but also began to include surgical treatment. Undescended testes could be retrieved. A greatly enlarged clitoris could be amputated to the usual size, but attempts to create a penis were unsuccessful. John Money and others controversially believed that children were more likely to develop a gender identity that matched sex of rearing than might be determined by chromosomes, gonads, or hormones. The resulting medical model was termed the "Optimal gender model". Historical accounts indicate that the development of sex-assignment surgery further reinforced the idea that sex could be medically constructed and permanently fixed, with surgical intervention functioning as a means of establishing legally recognized sex status.

== Challenges to requirements for sex assignment ==
Australian government guidelines published in 2013 stated that "individuals should be given the option to select M (male), F (female) or X (Indeterminate/Intersex/Unspecified)" and that government "[d]epartments and agencies will continue to collect sex and/or gender information to inform service delivery, perform their specific function or to contribute to broader government statistical or administrative purposes."

A 2014 report for the Dutch Ministry of Justice and Security allowed that while many gender-specific provisions in legislation no longer existed, sex registration, which had been introduced in 1811, was still required for a number of important state functions: family law, pregnancy protections, gender-segregated facilities, affirmative-action policies, and "a limited number of laws and regulations that are specifically aimed at men or women, such as military service". It also found that a majority of civil servants foresaw problems if official gender identifications were removed expanded beyond male and female. It noted that gender "seems to be increasingly experienced as 'sensitive' personal data, but is not yet protected as such by privacy regulations", and advocated for more flexibility and less official requests for gender identification.

In 2015, Canadian activists petitioned the British Columbia Human Rights Tribunal to force the government to stop recording the sex of newborns on birth certificates in order to avoid what complainants called "misgendered birth certificates" which they asserted were harmful to transgender people. In 2021, Canada changed the "sex" designation on the Census survey to "sex at birth" in order to reflect that a small number of Canadians subsequently change their gender.
