= John Money =

New Zealand psychologist and sexologist (1921–2006)

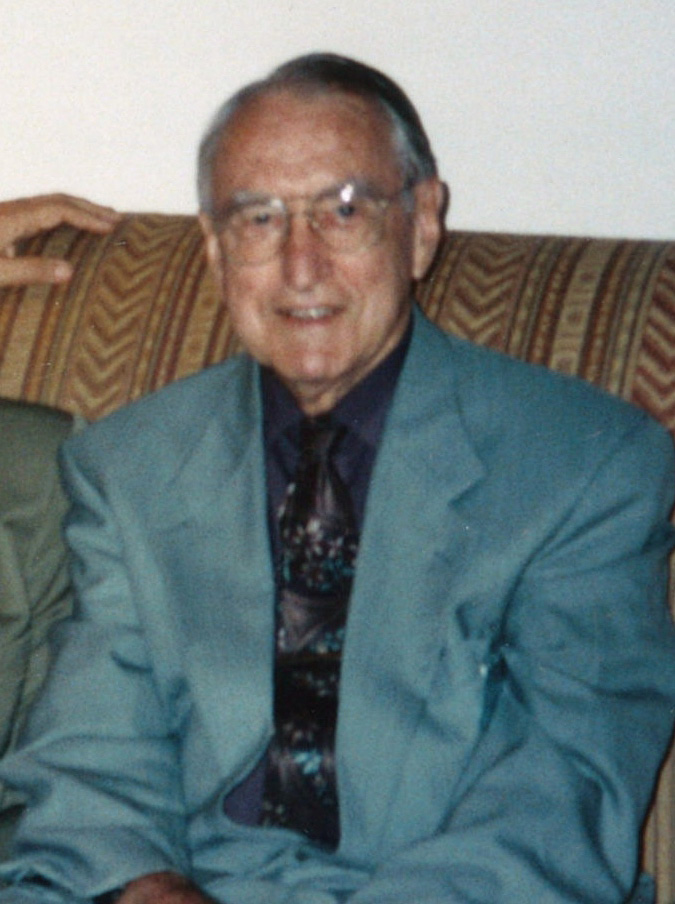
- Money in 1996
- Born: John William Money; 8 July 1921; Morrinsville, New Zealand
- Died: 7 July 2006 (aged 84); Towson, Maryland, U.S.
- Education: Victoria University of Wellington; Harvard University
- Awards: James McKeen Cattell Fellow Award (1992)
- Scientific career
- Fields: Psychology
- Workplaces: Johns Hopkins University

John William Money (8 July 1921 – 7 July 2006) was a New Zealand American psychologist, sexologist and professor at Johns Hopkins University known for his research on human sexual behavior and gender. Money researched paraphilia, including pedophilia, and pioneered the use of drug treatment to extinguish the libido of sex offenders. He advanced the use of new terminology in sex research, coining the terms gender role and sexual orientation. Despite popular belief, Money did not coin the term gender identity, but he did coin the term gender role.

Money was a proponent of genital surgeries for children with intersex conditions, believing that gender was malleable during the first two years of life and it was harmful to rear children as neither boys nor girls. The practice proved controversial when many intersex people later rejected the gender assigned to them. Money also applied the protocol to David Reimer, who had lost his penis in a botched circumcision, and advised his parents to raise him as a girl. Reimer struggled to adapt, feeling confused and exhibiting masculine behavior in childhood, and reverted to living as a male as a teenager when he became aware of the treatment. He died by suicide at age 38 following his twin brother's suicide, separation from his wife, and financial stress.

Money believed transgender people had an idée fixe, and he established the Johns Hopkins Gender Identity Clinic in 1965. Money screened adult patients for two years prior to granting them a medical transition, and believed sex roles should be de-stereotyped so that masculine women would be less likely to desire transition. His views have been criticized by transgender scholars and activists.

Today, Money is a subject of academic scrutiny among psychologists, ethicists, and intersex rights activists for his handling of the Reimer case, and his views continue to generate significant controversy. Critics allege he overlooked or misinterpreted evidence which contradicted his thesis, and more seriously accuse him of outright fraud or malpractice. Money was defended by his colleague Richard Green, who believed Money aimed to help rather than "experiment" on Reimer and operated under accepted medical knowledge of the time. Money's writing has been translated into many languages and includes around 2,000 articles, books, chapters and reviews. He received around 65 honors, awards and degrees in his lifetime.

== Early life ==
Money was born in Morrinsville, New Zealand, to a Christian fundamentalist family of English and Welsh descent. His parents were members of the Plymouth Brethren Christian Church. He attended Hutt Valley High School and initially studied psychology at Victoria University of Wellington, graduating with a double master's degree in psychology and education in 1944. He was a junior member of the psychology faculty at the University of Otago in Dunedin.

== Career and views ==
In 1947, at the age of 26, Money immigrated to the United States to study at the Psychiatric Institute of the University of Pittsburgh. In 1948, he became a doctoral candidate at Harvard University, and earned his PhD in 1952. Money became a professor of pediatrics and medical psychology at Johns Hopkins University, where he worked from 1952 until his death.

Money proposed and developed several theories related to the topics of gender identity and gender roles, and coined terms like gender role and lovemap. He popularized the term paraphilia (appearing in the DSM-III, which would later replace perversions) and introduced the term sexual orientation in place of sexual preference, arguing that attraction is not necessarily a matter of free choice. Although often misattributed to him, Money did not coin the term 'gender identity'. In 1960 and 1961, he co-authored two papers with Richard Green. Believing that gender identity was malleable within the first two years of life, Money advocated for the surgical "normalization" of the genitalia of intersex infants.

=== Sex offenders ===
Money pioneered the use of drug treatment for sex offenders to extinguish their sex drives. According to a 1987 paper, he employed the drug Depo-Provera (medroxyprogesterone acetate) for use on sex offenders at Johns Hopkins beginning in 1966. The practice later spread in the United States and Europe.

=== Sex reassignment of David Reimer ===
In 1966, a botched circumcision left eight-month-old Reimer without a penis. Money persuaded the baby's parents that sex reassignment surgery would be in Reimer's best interest. At the age of 22 months, Reimer underwent an orchiectomy, in which his testicles were surgically removed. He was reassigned to be raised as female and his name changed from Bruce to Brenda. Money further recommended hormone treatment, to which the parents agreed. Money then recommended a surgical procedure to create an artificial vagina, which the parents refused. Money published a number of papers reporting the reassignment as successful. David Reimer was raised under the "optimum gender rearing model" which was the common model for sex and gender socialization/medicalization for intersex youth. The model was heavily criticized for being sexist, and for assigning an arbitrary gender binary.

According to John Colapinto's biography of David Reimer, when Reimer and his twin Brian were six years old, Money showed the brothers pornography and instructed the two to rehearse sexual acts. Money instructed David position himself on all fours, and Brian was told to "come up behind [him] and place his crotch against [his] buttocks". Money also forced Reimer, in another sexual position, to have his "legs spread" with Brian on top. Reimer alleged that on "at least one occasion" Money took a photograph of the two children performing these acts. Colapinto speculated that Money's rationale for his treatment of the children was his belief that "childhood 'sexual rehearsal play' at thrusting movements and copulation" was important for a "healthy adult gender identity". Money was reportedly angered when they resisted. The Reimers recalled that Money was mild-mannered around their parents, but ill-tempered when alone with them. They also alleged that Money made the two children undergo "genital inspections"; when they resisted inspecting each other's genitals, Money got very aggressive. Reimer says, "He told me to take my clothes off, and I just did not do it. I just stood there. And he screamed, 'Now!' Louder than that. I thought he was going to give me a whupping. So I took my clothes off and stood there shaking."

At 14 years old and in extreme psychological agony, David Reimer was told the truth by his parents. He chose to begin calling himself David, and he underwent surgical procedures to revert the feminising bodily modifications. Money reported on Reimer's progress as the "John/Joan case", describing apparently successful female gender development and using this case to support the feasibility of sex reassignment and surgical reconstruction even in non-intersex cases.At this time the idea of a purely socially constructed gender identity and infant intersex medical interventions had become the accepted medical and sociological standard.

David Reimer's case came to international attention in 1997 when he told his story to Milton Diamond, an academic sexologist, who persuaded Reimer to allow him to report the outcome in order to dissuade physicians from treating other infants similarly. Soon after, Reimer went public with his story, and John Colapinto published a widely disseminated and influential account in Rolling Stone magazine in December 1997. This was later expanded into the bestselling biography As Nature Made Him: The Boy Who Was Raised as a Girl (2000), in which Colapinto described how—contrary to Money's reports—when living as Brenda, Reimer did not identify as a girl. He was ostracized and bullied by peers (who dubbed him "cavewoman"), and neither frilly dresses nor female hormones made him feel female.

In July 2002, Brian was found dead from an overdose of antidepressants. In May 2004, David committed suicide by shooting himself in the head with a sawed-off shotgun at the age of 38. According to his mother, "he had recently become depressed after losing his job and separating from his wife." Money argued that media response to Diamond's exposé was due to right-wing media bias and "the antifeminist movement". He said his detractors believed "masculinity and femininity are built into the genes, so women should get back to the mattress and the kitchen". However, intersex activists also criticized Money, stating that the unreported failure had led to the surgical reassignment of thousands of infants as a matter of policy. Privately, Money was mortified by the case, colleagues said, and as a rule did not discuss it. Money's colleague, Richard Green, defended Money's handling of the Reimer case, as a decision made under accepted medical knowledge of the time.

The 2025 documentary The Secret of Me argues that Money continued to present the anonymous "John/Joan" case as evidence of successful childhood sex reassignment in the 1975 book Sexual Signatures, despite evidence available to his clinical team that Reimer was experiencing serious difficulties and resisting the female identity assigned to him. The documentary connects the continued circulation of these claims to the adoption of similar treatment protocols for children with intersex traits. Its principal subject, intersex activist Jim Ambrose, underwent genital surgery in infancy, was raised as a girl and was not informed of his original anatomy or medical history until early adulthood.

=== Transgender people and the Johns Hopkins gender clinic ===
Money had a particular interest in gender dysphoria and transgender people. He maintained that transgender people had an Idée fixe which was unlikely to resolve on its own, and that psychotherapists had failed to alleviate gender dysphoria with therapy. In 1965, Money co-established the Gender Identity Clinic at Johns Hopkins with the endocrinologist Claude Migeon. Money screened adult patients for two years prior to granting them a medical transition, and reported that none regret the procedure. The hospital began performing sexual reassignment surgery in 1966, and was the first clinic in the United States to do so.

According to Goldie, many transgender people view Money as a "negative figure". In one paper, Money described trans women as "devious, demanding and manipulative in their relationships with people on whom they are also dependent" and “possibly also incapable of love". Money believed de-stereotyping sex roles might prevent people from wanting to transition, arguing "a tomboy-ish girl, prenatally androgenized, grows up to be a career-minded woman, not a transsexual who claims to need sex reassignment".

=== Homosexuality and sexual orientation ===
Money was a leading proponent of the idea that human sexual orientation develops through learning and gendered socialization. He believed that males, if surgically reassigned and raised as girls around birth, would grow up to be attracted to males and live as heterosexual women. However, in the case of David Reimer, he grew up to be attracted to women. A 2016 academic review found that in seven total cases of boys surgically reassigned and raised as girls (due to botched circumcision or cloacal exstrophy), all were strongly attracted to women, not men, inconsistent with this learning theory of homosexuality.

Money proposed that sexual rehearsal and play between children may be important for a healthy heterosexual development. He referred to aboriginal tribes where he apparently observed sex rehearsal between prepubescent children, and speculated that homosexuality could be prevented entirely if such a practice was embraced. In a 1975 opinion piece published in The New York Times, Money argued that "The forces of antisex cry in moral outrage when confronted with the evidence of sexual disabilities, and blame the new freedom. In fact they should blame the excess of inhibition and punishment regarding sex during the child hood of those whose sexuality is now disabled."

=== Chronophilias ===
Money coined the term chronophilia and nepiophilia (sexual attraction to toddlers and infants) in 1986. In two 1983 case study publications, Money stated that pedophilia, among other chronophilias, could be characterized as combining "devotion, affection, and limerence", "comradeship with a touch of hero-worship" and ultimately as "harmless... in most instances". He stated that both sexual researchers and the public do not make distinctions between affectional pedophilia and sadistic pedophilia. According to Colapinto, Money told ''Paidika'', a now defunct Dutch journal of pedophilia, that:

If I were to see the case of a boy aged 10 or 12 who's intensely attracted toward a man in his 20s or 30s, if the relationship is totally mutual, and the bonding is genuinely totally mutual, then I would not call it pathological in any way.

Also in 1986, Money postulated the existence of multiple chronophilic forms of erotic age-roleplaying, or age impersonation, which he named "infantilism", "juvenilism", "adolescentilism", "gerontilism".

== Books on sexology ==
Money co-edited a 1969 book, Transsexualism and Sex Reassignment, which helped bring more acceptance to sexual reassignment surgery and transsexual individuals. Money introduced numerous definitions related to gender in journal articles in the 1950s, many of them as a result of his studies of intersex morphology. His definition of gender is based on his understanding of sex differences among human beings. According to Money, the fact that one sex produces ova and the other sex produces sperm is the irreducible criterion of sex difference. However, there are other sex-derivative differences that follow in the wake of this primary dichotomy. These differences involve the way urine is expelled from the human body and other questions of sexual dimorphism. According to Money's theory, sex-adjunctive differences are typified by the smaller size of females and their problems in moving around while nursing infants. This then makes it more likely that the males do the roaming and hunting.

Sex-arbitrary differences are those that are purely conventional: for example, color selection (baby blue for boys, pink for girls). Some of the latter differences apply to life activities, such as career opportunities for men versus women. Finally, Money created the now-common term gender role, which he differentiated from the concept of the more traditional terminology sex role. This grew out of his studies of intersex people. In his studies of intersex people, Money alleged that there are six variables that define sex. While in the average person all six would line up unequivocally as either all "male" or "female", in an intersex person any one, or more than one, of these could be inconsistent with the others, leading to various kinds of anomalies. In his seminal 1955 paper, he defined these factors as:

1. assigned sex and sex of rearing
2. external genital morphology
3. internal reproductive structures
4. hormonal and secondary sex characteristics
5. gonadal sex
6. chromosomal sex

and added:

"Patients showing various combinations and permutations of these six sexual variables may be appraised with respect to a seventh variable: 7. Gender role and orientation as male or female, established while growing up."

He then defined gender role as:

"all those things that a person says or does to disclose himself or herself as having the status of boy or man, girl or woman, respectively. It includes, but is not restricted to, sexuality in the sense of eroticism. Gender role is appraised in relation to the following: general mannerisms, deportment and demeanor; play preferences and recreational interests; spontaneous topics of talk in unprompted conversation and casual comment; content of dreams, daydreams and fantasies; replies to oblique inquiries and projective tests; evidence of erotic practices, and, finally, the person's own replies to direct inquiry."

Money made the concept of gender a broader, more inclusive concept than one of masculine/feminine. For him, gender included not only one's status as a man or a woman, but was also a matter of personal recognition, social assignment, or legal determination; not only on the basis of one's genitalia, but also on the basis of somatic and behavioral criteria that go beyond genital differences. In 1972, Money presented his theories in Man and Woman, Boy and Girl, a college level textbook. The book featured David Reimer as an example of gender reassignment.

In his book Gay, Straight and In-Between: The Sexology of Erotic Orientation, Money develops a conception of "bodymind". "Bodymind" is a way for scientists, in developing a science about sexuality, to move on from the platitudes of dichotomy between nature versus nurture, innate versus the acquired, biological versus the social, and psychological versus the physiological. He suggested that all of these capitalize on the ancient, pre-Platonic, pre-biblical conception of body versus the mind, and the physical versus the spiritual. In coining the term "bodymind", in this sense, Money wishes to move beyond these very ingrained principles of our folk or vernacular psychology.

Money developed a view of "Concepts of Determinism" which, transcultural, transhistorical, and universal, all people have in common, sexologically or otherwise. These include pairbondage, troopbondage, abidance, ycleptance, foredoomance, with these coping strategies: adhibition (engagement), inhibition, explication. Money suggested that the concept of "threshold" – the release or inhibition of sexual (or other) behavior – is most useful for sex research as a substitute for any concept of motivation. Moreover, it confers the distinct advantage of having continuity and unity to what would otherwise be a highly disparate and varied field of research. It also allows for the classification of sexual behavior. For Money, the concept of threshold has great value because of the wide spectrum to which it applies. "It allows one to think developmentally or longitudinally, in terms of stages or experiences that are programmed serially, or hierarchically, or cybernetically (i.e. regulated by mutual feedback)."

== Personal life ==
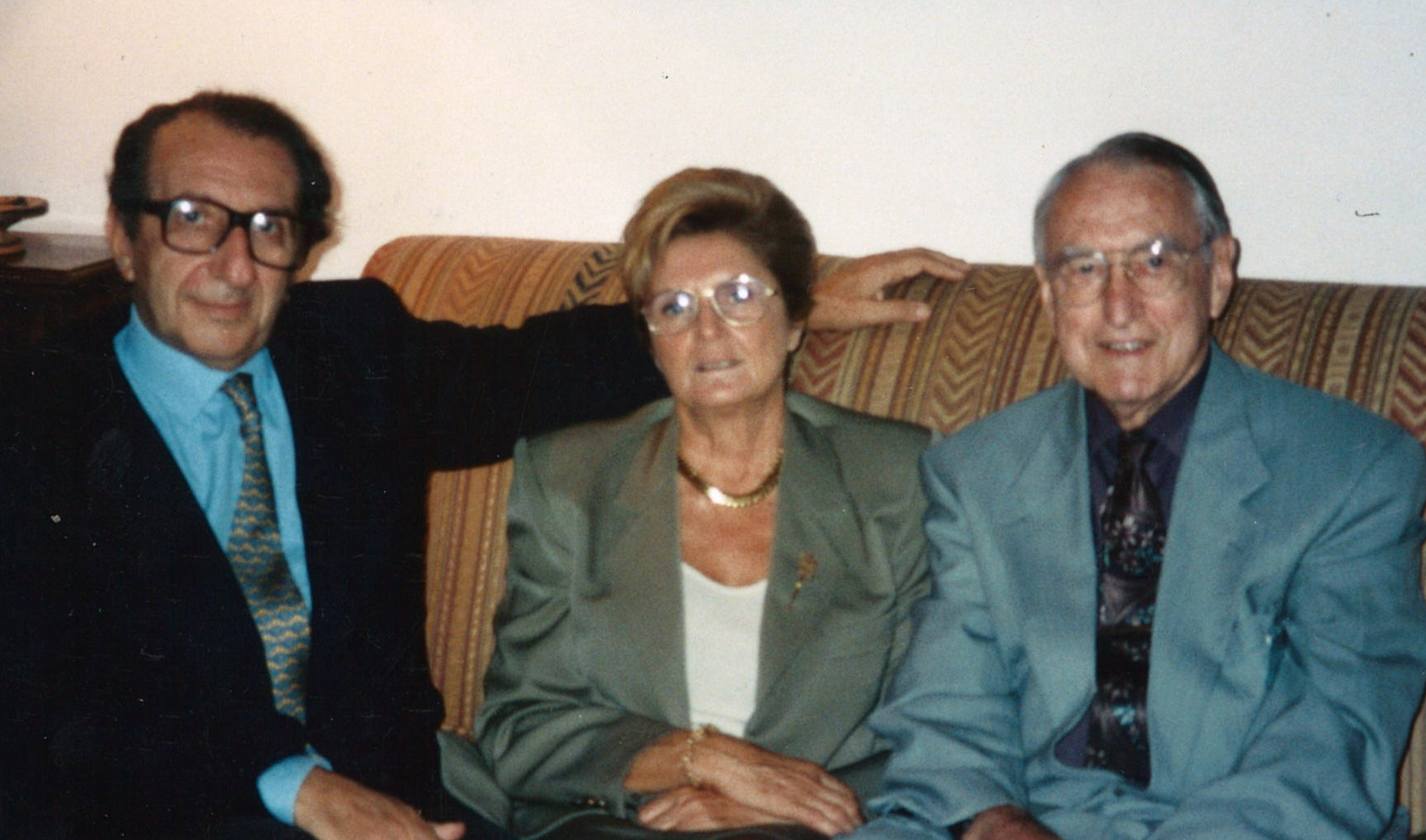
Money (right) with sexologist Romano Forleo and Forleo's wife in Rome, 1996

Money was briefly married in the 1950s and never had any children. He was reportedly bisexual. According to his friends, Money lived an "eccentric lifestyle." He only bought secondhand clothing and rarely threw things away he deemed reusable. For over 40 years, Money lived in a house in Baltimore near the Johns Hopkins medical campus. His house had a collection of anthropological art from his travels abroad, including his studies of aboriginal communities in Australia. Money was an early supporter and patron of many famous artists, including New Zealand artists Rita Angus and Theo Schoon, and the American artist Lowell Nesbitt, whom he provided with an x-ray for one artwork. Money was also acquainted with Yoko Ono, visiting her in London with Richard Green, and fashioning some of her sculptures.

In 2002, as his Parkinson's disease worsened, Money donated a substantial portion of his art collection to the Eastern Southland Art Gallery in Gore, New Zealand. In 2003, the New Zealand Prime Minister Helen Clark opened the John Money wing at the gallery. Money died on 7 July 2006, one day before his 85th birthday, in Towson, Maryland, of complications from Parkinson's disease. He was survived by eight nieces and nephews.

== In media ==
In 2004 the BBC science series Horizon covered details of Money's theories of the lives on the Reimer twins: "The Boy Who Was Turned into a Girl" aired in 2000 and "Dr Money and the Boy with No Penis" in 2004.

The Law & Order: Special Victims Unit episode "Identity" (2005) was based on David and Brian Reimer's lives and their treatment by Money. The Money and Reimer case was highlighted in the 2023 documentary Every Body, in which intersex individuals describe growing up and their struggles due to their gender being mis-identified.

The 2025 documentary The Secret of Me, directed by Grace Hughes-Hallett, follows intersex activist Jim Ambrose, who underwent genital surgery in infancy, was raised as a girl and was not informed of his original anatomy or medical history until adulthood. Contemporary reporting described the treatment applied to Ambrose as following a clinical protocol derived from Money's theories. The documentary also examines Money's reporting of the David Reimer experiment. It describes Money's continued presentation of the reassignment as successful in the 1975 book Sexual Signatures—despite evidence that the case was failing—as an act of academic fraud. Independent reviews similarly noted that Reimer's unhappiness did not appear in Money's published accounts and described this omission as academic malpractice.

== Selected works ==
- Money, John. (1952). Hermaphroditism: An Inquiry into the Nature of a Human Paradox. Thesis (Ph.D.), Harvard University.
- ____, and Patricia Tucker. (1975). Sexual Signatures on Being a Man or a Woman. Little Brown & Co: ISBN 0-316-57825-8
- ____ (1985). The Destroying Angel. Prometheus. ISBN 0-879-75277-7
- ____ (1986). Venuses Penuses. Prometheus. ISBN 978-0879753276
- ____ (1986). Lovemaps: Clinical Concepts of Sexual/Erotic Health and Pathology, Paraphilia, and Gender Transposition in Childhood, Adolescence, and Maturity. New York: Irvington. ISBN 0-8264-0852-4
- ____ (1988) Gay, Straight, and In-Between: The Sexology of Erotic Orientation. New York: Oxford University Press. ISBN 0-19-505407-5
- ____ (1989). Vandalized Lovemaps: Paraphilic Outcome of 7 Cases in Pediatric Sexology. Prometheus Books: ISBN 0-87975-513-X
- ____ (1994). Sex Errors of the Body and Related Syndromes: A Guide to Counseling Children, Adolescents, and Their Families , 2nd ed. Baltimore: P.H. Brooks Publishing Company. ISBN 1-55766-150-2
- ____ (1995). Gendermaps: Social Constructionism, Feminism, and Sexosophical History. New York: Continuum. ISBN 0-8264-0852-4
- ____, and Anke Ehrhardt. (1996). Man & Woman, Boy & Girl: Gender Identity from Conception to Maturity. Northvale, N.J.: Jason Aronson. Originally published: 1972 ISBN 0-8018-1406-5
- ____ (1999). The Lovemap Guidebook: A Definitive Statement. Continuum. ISBN 0-8264-1203-3

== See also ==
- Comprachicos
- Intersexion – the impact of Money's theories on the treatment of intersex people is featured in this documentary
- Every Body – a further documentary featuring the impact of Money's theories on intersex people
- Robert Stoller
