= John Colapinto =

Canadian journalist and writer

- Born: 1958 (age 67–68); Toronto, Ontario, Canada
- Occupations: Journalist, author, novelist, staff writer
- Spouse: Donna Mehalko
- Children: 1 son
- Writing career
- Genres: Fiction, journalism
- Notable work: As Nature Made Him: The Boy Who Was Raised as a Girl

John Colapinto (born in 1958) is a Canadian journalist, author and novelist and a staff writer at The New Yorker. In 2000, he wrote the New York Times bestseller As Nature Made Him: The Boy Who Was Raised as a Girl, which exposed the details of the David Reimer case, a boy who had undergone a sex change in infancy—a medical experiment long heralded as a success, but which was, in fact, a failure.

== Career ==
Before working on staff at The New Yorker, Colapinto's articles appeared in Vanity Fair, Esquire, Mademoiselle, Us, New York and The New York Times Magazine, and in 1995 he became a contributing editor at Rolling Stone.

He also wrote the screenplay for the 1990 Canadian short film The Star Turn.

== Writing ==
For Rolling Stone, Colapinto wrote feature stories on a variety of subjects including AIDS, kids and guns, heroin in the music business, and Penthouse magazine creator, Bob Guccione.

In 1998, Colapinto published a 20,000 word feature story in Rolling Stone titled "The True Story of John/Joan", an account of David Reimer, who had undergone a sex change in infancy following a botched circumcision in which he lost his penis. The medical experiment had been long heralded as a success, but was, in fact, a failure. The story, which detailed not only Reimer's tortured life, but the medical scandal surrounding its cover-up, won the ASME Award for reporting. In 2000, Colapinto published a book-length account of the case, As Nature Made Him: The Boy Who Was Raised as a Girl. The book was a New York Times bestseller and the film rights were bought by director Peter Jackson. Reimer took his life in 2004.

Colapinto also wrote a novel, About the Author, a tale of literary envy and theft. It was published in August 2001 and was a number six pick on the Book Sense 76 list of best novels of the season; it was a nominee for the International Dublin Literary Award and for a number of years was under option by DreamWorks where playwright Patrick Marber wrote a screen adaptation. The film rights to the novel were acquired by producer Scott Rudin but a shootable screenplay failed to materialize and Rudin allowed his option to lapse. In the spring of 2023, the novel was optioned by Tr-Star Pictures and is, as of 2024, in development at that studio.

Colapinto's second novel, Undone, a satire hingeing on faux-incest, was published by HarperCollins Canada in April 2015. It was rejected by 41 US publishers and every publisher in Europe on grounds that it was too challenging in its subject matter. A newspaper feature story in The Globe and Mail gave an account of the novel's universal rejection in Colapinto's adopted country. A highly positive review in the Toronto Star called Undone "an equally inventive but bolder novel" than Colapinto's debut; a review in the Globe and Mail called the novel "a noir that, like Francine Prose's Blue Angel and Philip Roth's American Pastoral, details the unravelling of the moral American man and his world."

In June 2015, Colapinto spoke about the novel, and its difficult publishing history, on the CBC Radio program "q":

The novel was eventually acquired by independent publisher, Soft Skull Press, a division of Counterpoint Press, based in Berkeley, California. Undone was published in April 2016 in the United States. Trade magazine Booklist gave the novel a starred review that said: "Cannily over the top in its comic depravity and magnetizing in its sympathy, Colapinto's battle royal of innocence and evil, blindness and illumination, betrayal and love will thrill those who enjoy subversively erotic and suspenseful fiction of the finest execution and most cutting implications."

In April 2016, The New York Times published an article, "Colapinto's Complaint," that described the novel as reviving the "male-centric literary sex novel." The article sparked a two-day tweet storm in which Colapinto was excoriated for resurrecting the "male gaze" in fiction.

As a staff writer for The New Yorker, Colapinto has written about subjects as diverse as medicinal leeches; Sotheby's auctioneer Tobias Meyer; fashion designers Karl Lagerfeld and Rick Owens; the linguistic oddities of the Pirahã people (an Amazonian tribe); and Paul McCartney. His piece on the Pirahã was anthologized in The Best American Science and Nature Writing (2008); his New Yorker story about retail loss prevention was included in The Best American Crime Reporting (2009); and his New Yorker profile of neuroscientist V.S. Ramachandran was selected by Freeman Dyson for inclusion in The Best American Science and Nature Writing.

== Awards and nominations ==
Colapinto won the Canadian National Magazine Award for "All the Right Moves" (about chess prodigy Jeff Sarwer and his unconventional upbringing): "Saturday Night Magazine," 1987.

He received an ASME Award for reporting "The True Story of John/Joan" in ''Rolling Stone.

As Nature Made Him was a finalist for the 2001 Lambda Literary Award for Transgender Literature.

Colapinto's Guccione story for Rolling Stone was a finalist for the ASME Award in profile writing in 2004.

== Personal life ==
Colapinto lives in New York City's Upper East Side. He is married to Donna Mehalko, fashion illustrator, artist, and author of "Mr Wrong, a Users Guide", a humorous take on dating that recommends ways to use Mr Wrong for maximum benefit while waiting for Mr Right; they have one son.

He plays keyboards and sings with the Sequoias, a band made up mostly of New York magazine journalists.

== Bibliography ==
=== Books ===
- Colapinto, John (2000). As Nature Made Him: The Boy Who Was Raised as a Girl. Harper Collins. ISBN 9780060929596.
- — (2001). About the Author: A Novel. HarperCollins. ISBN 9780060194178.
- — (2016). Undone: A Novel.
- Colapinto, John (2021). This is the Voice. Simon & Schuster. ISBN 978-1982128746.

=== Essays and reporting ===
- Colapinto, John (March 15, 2010). "New note". Profiles. The New Yorker. Vol. 86, no. 4. pp. 32–39. Profile of Esperanza Spalding.
- — (March 4, 2013). "Giving voice: a surgeon pioneers methods to help singers sing again". Dept. of Arts and Sciences. The New Yorker. Vol. 89, no. 3. pp. 48–57.
- — (December 22–29, 2014). "Material question: graphene may be the most remarkable substance ever discovered. But what's it for?". Annals of Innovation. The New Yorker. Vol. 90, no. 41. pp. 50–63.
- — (May 18, 2015). "Lighting the brain: Karl Deisseroth and the optogenetics breakthrough". Profiles. The New Yorker. Vol. 91, no. 13. pp. 74–83.

=== Critical studies and reviews ===
- Medley, Mark (May 1, 2015). "Why won't American publishers touch John Colapinto's new novel?". The Globe and Mail. Review of Undone.
