= Definitions of intersex =

Various criteria have been offered for the definition of intersex, including ambiguous genitalia, atypical genitalia, and differential sexual development. Ambiguous genitalia occurs in roughly 0.05% of all births, usually caused by masculinization or feminization during pregnancy, these conditions range from full androgen insensitivity syndrome to ovotesticular syndrome.

1.7% of people are born with a disorder of sexual development (DSD) as defined by the DSD consortium, such as those with Klinefelter's syndrome. The DSD was specifically made to be as inclusive to all atypical sexual development; not all conditions within the DSD cause sexual ambiguity or affect individuals to the same extent. In other estimates, Definitions are limited to ambiguous conditions in which typical chromosomal categorization patterns is inconsistent with phenotypic sex, or in which the phenotype is not easily classifiable as either male or female," with the prevalence of about 0.018%.

Most intersex activism is based around the end of unnecessary medical interventions on intersex youth which attempt to assign an arbitrary gender binary, often causing physical harm with no input from the child. Intersex conditions are usually expanded to include the DSD more generally, including conditions without sexual ambiguity. 0.05% of births are medically treated or considered to have ambiguous genitalia.

== Causes of intersex development ==
The overall causes of intersex conditions are complex, and are caused primarily by sexual development during pregnancy. Certain individuals may have a masculinized clitoris or a feminized penis, however this might change after pregnancy. The exact differentiation of ovotestis of intersex people are often ambiguous. Other cases of intersex conditions can occur when hormones are taken during pregnancy such as estrogens or androgens, which can lead to atypical sexual development. Commonly intersex people are defined as those who are born with ambiguous genitalia, usually within the context of the OGR, or individuals with substantial atypical sexual development such as those with XX male.

Most conditions under the DSD are not apparent at birth, and most are not medicalized. Certain definitions declare the need for atypical masculinization or feminization during fetal development to declare an intersex condition. Under this definition, cloacal exstrophy a rare condition which is caused by the stomach internal organs developing incorrectly would not be intersex. Individuals with cloacal exstrophy who are born with XY do not develop a penis and are usually castrated and assigned female at birth. These people are medicalized like other people with intersex conditions and the OGR model. Due to this individuals with cloacal exstrophy are often considered intersex. InterACT the leading organization of intersex rights in the US, states that 1.5% of children are born with an intersex condition (DSD), and 0.05% are born with full ambiguous genitalia.

=== Assigned sex ===
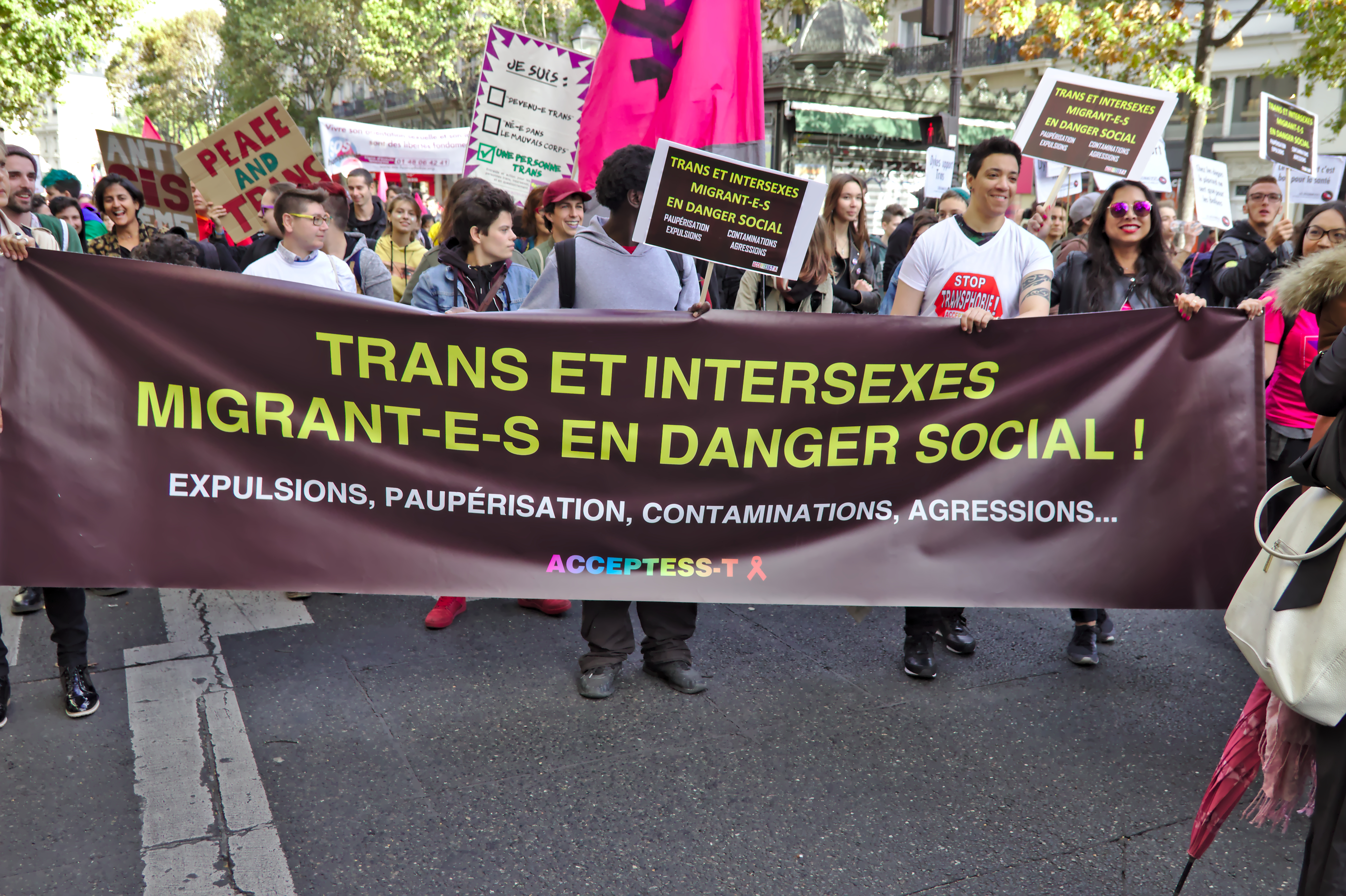
Intersex banner at a trans march reading: "Trans and intersex, migrants in social danger: expulsions, impoverishment, contamination, and violence." Existrans 2017, Paris.

Medical practices for Intersex children modeled gender identity as being learned, as such once a gender was assigned it was to be permanent for the individual's life even if the individual expressed discontent. This system was known as the optimum gender of rearing model (OGR model) which attempted to define a binary for intersex children. Some individuals who did not have any intersex conditions were raised under the OGR model, such as David Reimer who suffered a botched circumcision and was assigned female at seven months. The primary goal of the OGR was to stop gender incongruence, and to assign a gender binary for "proper" sex socialization. The model often specifically involved the falsification of medical history, such as the karyotype falsification or that internal testis were ovaries and needed to be removed for "cancer," despite no physical complications existing from their presence.

There is a high bias to assign intersex people with ambiguous genitalia as female at birth, as it was generally thought that it was easier to create a girl than a boy. Likewise as puberty would result in general feminization for most intersex children as well as a low libido, it was thought that they should be assigned female. This was also motivated by the fact that vaginoplasty was far more developed than phalloplasty.

Intersex advocates used a feminist perspective for criticism of the OGR as inherently sexist and cruel. The OGR modeled girls as passive and the receivers of penetration, and boys as the givers of penetration. As most intersex conditions cause vagina-like development and no phallus, medical staff were biased towards assigning female at birth. Transfeminists and queer liberationists particularly criticized the OGR model for not allowing children to deviate from gender binary or expression. Likewise, feminists view bodily autonomy as a fundamental human right, which led to criticisms of the OGR taking away the bodily autonomy of intersex people.

== Intersex and medical definitions ==
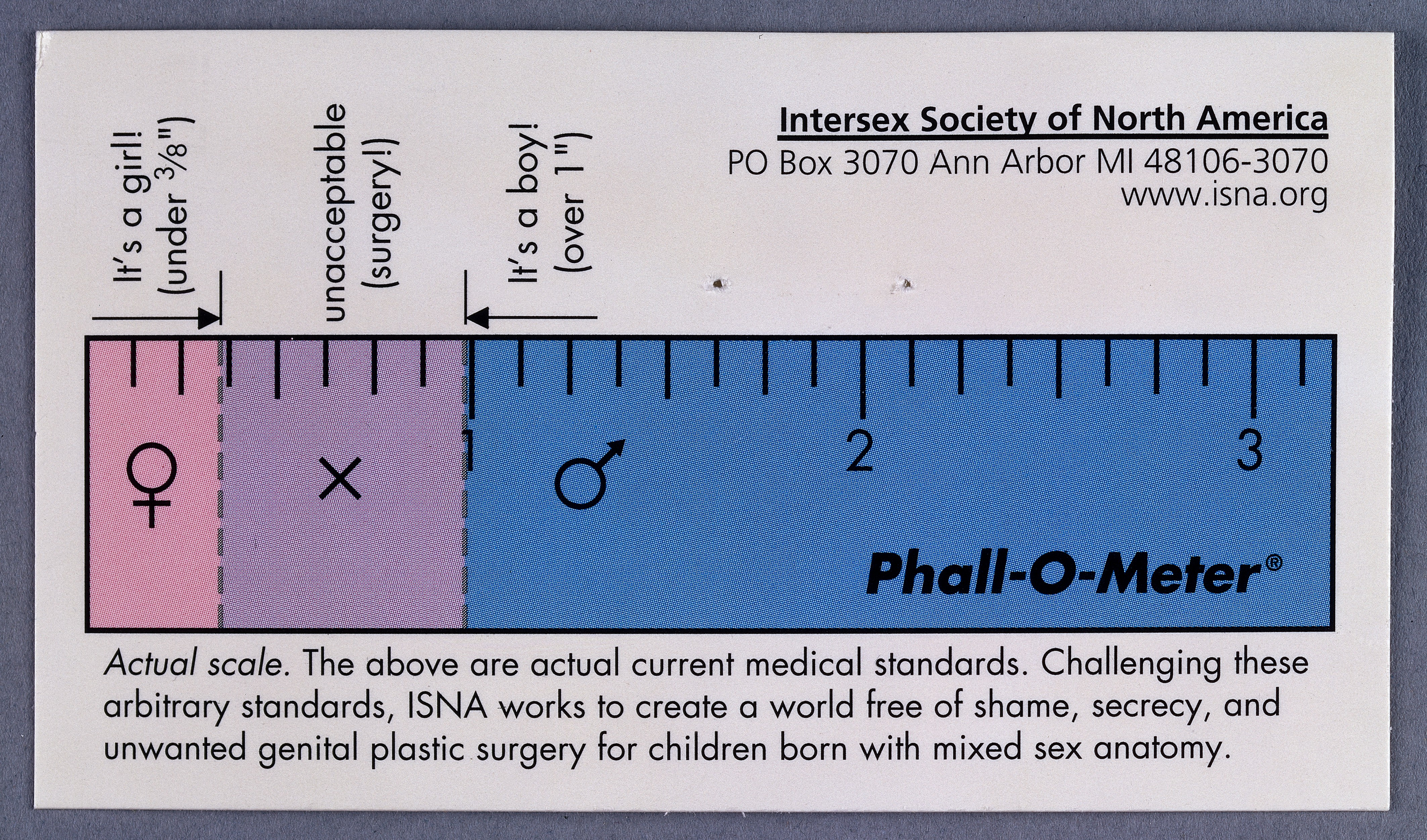
The Phall-O-Meter satirizes clinical assessments of appropriate clitoris and penis length at birth, and the definition of ambiguous genitalia. It is based on research published by Suzanne Kessler.

The OGR stated that gender non-conformity was a physiological threat which affected an individual's ability to function in normal society. Most research has found this to be false and that the medical procedures practiced against intersex individuals generally leads to isolation, physiological stress and physical complications throughout life. The definition of intersex is closely linked to the specific medical interventions on intersex people. According to the ISNA 1.92% of the population will have some variation in sexual development throughout their lives, (0.42% excluding LOCAH). 1% of people have bodies that "differ from standard male or female," and 0.1-0.2% of births are considered for intersex genital surgeries.

The DSD as a model was advocated for by intersex advocates to include all variation of atypical sexual development. Specifically the DSD exists as replacement for the OGR which was the standard model for individuals with atypical sexual development. This model stated goal was to assign a gender binary, usually female via non-consensual medicalization, often via the falsification of medical records. After the publication of individuals who had undergone the OGR model and had gone through serious physiological distress, the model was discredited. The term "disorders of sexual development" was chosen to reflect the variation of sexual development over differences which effects all individuals, this however has been controversial, with many instead opting for "differentiation" or "variation."

The DSD has generally superseded the OGR in the US, although no official medical precautions exist against intersex genital mutilation in the US. Another point of contention is intersex conditions and karyotype, while many intersex individuals have atypical gene expression, many intersex individuals are born due to hormonal changes in pregnancy, either natural or induced. As an example, a case of a woman who had a virilized clitoris which was surgically altered during her birth, brought up the point that she was intersex, which was stated to be "false" by a doctor as her mother had gone on progesterone, instead of natural virilization which induced biological change. Generally those who have undergone the OGR model, or have ambiguous genitalia are considered intersex. The DSD consortium was specifically made to remedy this, and was advocated for by intersex activists by including all differentiation in sexual development.

The definitions of intersex genitalia are difficult as different medical practices exist in different regions for what a "normal" penis or vagina should look like.

== Spectrum approach ==
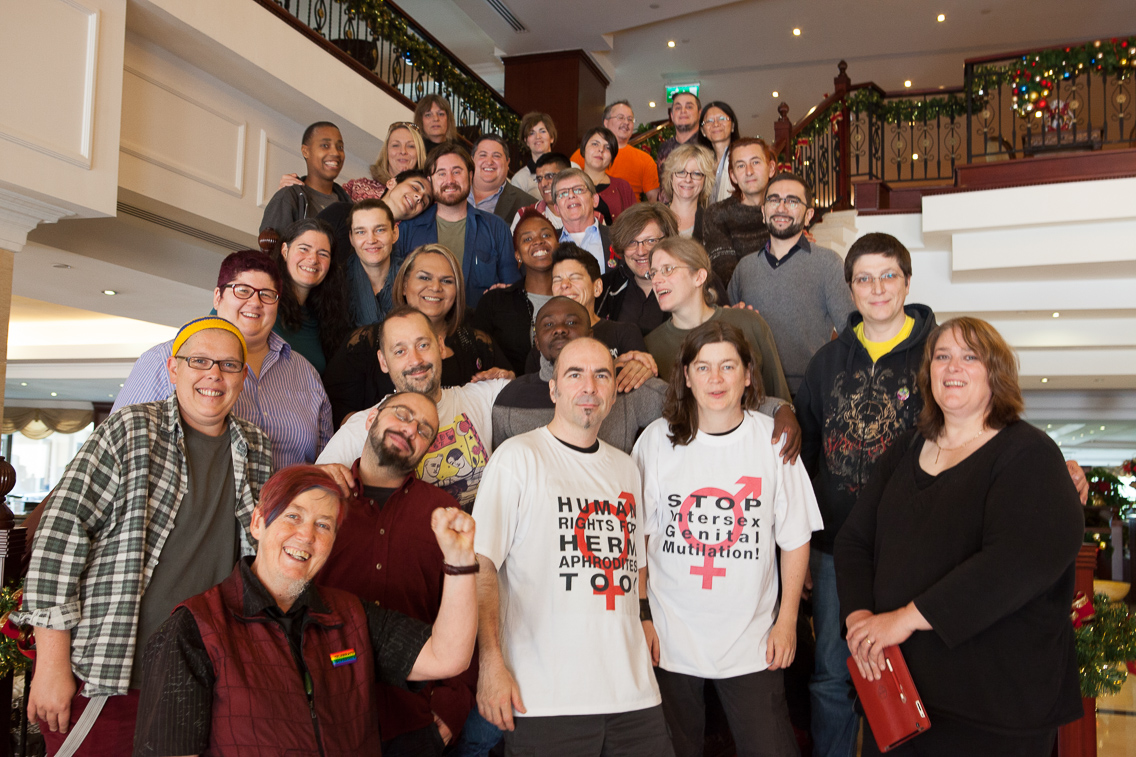
Participants at the third International Intersex Forum, Malta, in December 2013

Many intersex activists have advocated for a spectrum based approach for intersex conditions, which would differentiate various intersex conditions, including hormonal differences. Intersex conditions, even the same conditions such as ovotesticular syndrome, can vary wildly in terms of organs, genetic expression, phenotype, genotype, and karyotype. Under this model intersex conditions would be described via their own individualized effects described as effecting individuals on a spectrum. The DSD generally describes this by the description of individualized care for people with atypical sexual development, making the distinction between different conditions.

== See also ==
- Yogyakarta Principles
- Genetic diagnosis of intersex
- History of intersex surgery
- Intersex human rights
- Disorders of sex development
- Androgen insensitivity syndrome
- Intersex
