= List of intersex people =

Intersex people are born with sex characteristics, such as genitals, gonads and chromosome patterns that, according to the UN Office of the High Commissioner for Human Rights, "do not fit the typical definitions for male or female bodies".

Intersex people have many different gender identities, and so there is no presumption that people on this list have any particular sex assigned at birth, nor any particular gender identity.

This list consists of well-known intersex people. The individual listings note the subject's main occupation or source of notability.

== Notable intersex people ==
=== A ===
- Carlett Brown Angianlee, Naval officer; considered likely to be the first African American to undergo gender affirmation surgery
- K. Ancrum, American speculative fiction author
- Kitty Anderson, Icelandic intersex activist and co-chair of OII Europe.
- Shou Arai, manga artist and author
- Eden Atwood, U.S. jazz musician, actor, and intersex rights advocate

=== B ===
- Karl M. Baer (1885–1956), German-Israeli author, social worker, suffragette and Zionist
- Nubia Barahona, a ten-year-old American girl murdered in 2011
- Herculine Barbin; the 19th century memoirs of this French intersex person were published by Michel Foucault in 1980. Barbin's birthday, November 8, is now observed as Intersex Day of Remembrance.
- Janik Bastien-Charlebois, Québécois sociologist, researcher and activist
- Max Beck, U.S. activist and participant in the demonstration on October 26, 1996, that led to the establishment of Intersex Awareness Day
- Michelle Belanger (born 1973), American author and singer
- Aleksander Berezkin (Russian: Александр Берёзкин), Russian intersex immigrant rights activist with Klinefelter syndrome
- Maddie Blaustein, American voice actor and comic creator known for her roles as Meowth in Pokémon and E-123 Omega in the Sonic the Hedgehog series, content creator for Second Life
- Tony Briffa, Australian intersex and human rights activist; world's first out intersex Mayor and first publicly elected out intersex person. Current co-executive director of Intersex Human Rights Australia, and Vice-President and former President of the Androgen Insensitivity Syndrome Support Group Australia.
- Alec Butler, Canadian playwright and filmmaker

=== C ===
- Mauro Cabral, Argentinian intersex activist, writer, co-director of GATE
- Jeff Cagandahan, a Filipino intersex human rights activist at Intersex Asia who successful appealed for a change of name and gender on his birth certificate
- Lady Colin Campbell, UK author and socialite
- Morgan Carpenter, Australian intersex activist who created the modern intersex flag which features a purple circle and yellow background; co-executive director of Intersex Human Rights Australia
- Eleno de Céspedes, 16th-century intersex person in Spain
- Dutee Chand, Indian athlete who successfully challenged World Athletics regulations preventing her from running
- Cheryl Chase, also known as Bo Laurent, U.S. intersex activist and founder of the Intersex Society of North America
- Hiker Chiu, founder of Oii-Chinese
- Caroline Cossey, English model
- Cary Gabriel Costello, U.S. associate professor of sociology and advocate for transgender and intersex rights
- AJ Clementine, Australian model, internet celebrity, and writer
- Roberta Cowell, British racing driver and pilot
- Roberta Close, Brazilian fashion model, actress and television personality
- Obioma Chukwuike, Nigerian intersex human-rights activist

=== D ===
- Diophantus of Abae, 2nd-century Macedonian Greek soldier
- Lisa Lee Dark, Welsh opera singer and voice actress
- Georgiann Davis, U.S. sociology scholar and researcher on intersex issues
- Vaginal Davis, U.S. genderqueer performing artist, painter, composer and writer
- Fiore de Henriquez (1921–2004), Italian-British sculptor
- Tiger Devore, U.S. clinical psychologist, educator on intersex issues since 1984, appears in the short film XXXY (2000)
- Foekje Dillema (1926–2007), Dutch track and field athlete
- Arisleyda Dilone, U.S. Latina film director and actor
- Raven van Dorst, Dutch singer, musician and TV presenter
- Betsy Driver, Mayor of Flemington, New Jersey; intersex activist and first intersex elected official in the United States
- Karl Dürrge (also known as Maria Dorothea Derrier: 1780–1835), Prussian intersex man and human subject in medical research

=== E ===
- Lili Elbe (1882–1931), Danish painter; a transgender and possibly intersex woman, and one of the earliest transgender women to receive gender affirmation surgery

=== F ===
- Florian-Ayala Fauna, American artist, musician, and music producer
- Favorinus of Arelate (c.80–c.160 AD), a Roman sophist and philosopher who flourished during the reign of Hadrian
- Fernanda Fernández (1755–unknown), Spanish intersex person
- Sir Ewan Forbes (1912–1991), UK noble, formerly Elizabeth Forbes-Sempill and 11th Baronet of Craigievar
- Sara Forsberg (born 1994), Finnish singer, songwriter, and television presenter
- Crystal Frasier, American artist and game designer, and also a trans woman

=== G ===
- River Gallo, Salvadoran-American filmmaker, actor, model, and intersex rights activist
- Pratima Gaonkar, Indian athlete who killed herself following the results of a sex verification test
- Dan Christian Ghattas, German activist, historian and author of Human Rights between the Sexes, a first international comparative study of the human rights of intersex people and executive director of OII Europe
- Gottlieb Göttlich (1798–unknown), German medical research subject
- Seven Graham (born 1969), activist, comedian, filmmaker and playwright, and drug addiction counsellor
- Sarah Gronert, German tennis player
- Sally Gross (1953–2014), South African intersex, anti-apartheid and Israel/Palestine human rights activist; secured first mention of intersex in anti-discrimination law

=== H ===
- Thomas(ine) Hall, a person of indeterminate gender in 17th-century colonial Virginia
- Bonnie Hart, Australian multi-disciplinary artist and president of the Androgen Insensitivity Syndrome Support Group Australia
- Phoebe Hart, Australian filmmaker and director of 2010 autobiographical documentary Orchids, My Intersex Adventure
- Miriam van der Have, Dutch activist, co-chair of OII Europe and director of Nederlands Netwerk intersekse/DSD
- Thea Hillman, American author, poet, and activist
- Francis Heaulme, a French serial killer with Klinefelter syndrome
- Morgan Holmes, Canadian activist, professor of sociology and author of several books on intersex including Critical Intersex
- Juliana Huxtable. U.S. artist and writer

=== I ===
- Maximila Imali, Kenyan sprinter
- Im Seong-gu, Korean intersex person who flourished in the 16th century

=== J ===
- Natasha Jiménez, Costa Rican and Latin American intersex and trans activist
- James Johnson, Nigerian footballer
- John Junior (born 1988), British mental health campaigner
- Alex Jürgen, Austrian intersex activist

=== K ===
- Julius Kaggwa, award-winning Ugandan activist
- John Kenley, pioneering U.S. theatrical producer
- Stefan Kiszko, British man falsely imprisoned for the murder of Lesley Molseed
- Ewa Kłobukowska, Polish sprinter
- Zdeněk Koubek, Czech track athlete
- Emi Koyama, Japanese-American internist at Intersex Society of North America, co-founder of Intersex Awareness Day, and sex worker and transfeminist activist
- Anton Krzyzanowski (Russian: Антон Крыжановский), Russian intersex rights activist and sound designer, open about living with ovotestis
- Irene Kuzemko (Russian: Ирина Куземко), Russian-Ukrainian intersex activist

=== L ===
- Teresa Lamoneda, Cuban soldier in the Spanish Civil War
- Lê Văn Duyệt, Nguyen dynasty general and high-ranking mandarin in Vietnam
- Bobby Joe Long, a U.S. serial killer with Klinefelter syndrome
- Ricardo López, a Uruguayan-American with Klinefelter syndrome who stalked and attempted to murder Icelandic singer Björk in 1996
- Small Luk, intersex activist living in Hong Kong, founder of Beyond the Boundary – Knowing and Concerns Intersex

=== M ===
- Gopi Shankar Madurai, Indian, one of the founding members of Srishti Madurai and Intersex Asia, also the first openly intersex and genderqueer person appointed in the public office with a position in par with Under Secretary to Government of India. Ex-Hindu Monk.
- Alex MacFarlane, first known holder of an Australian passport with an 'X' sex descriptor
- Aprilio Manganang, an Indonesian volleyball player, reassigned male after retirement
- Gabriel J. Martín, Spanish gay and intersex psychologist and author
- Maria José Martínez-Patiño, a Spanish hurdler who was dismissed from competition in 1986 for failing a sex test
- Shabnam Mausi, Indian politician
- Santiago Mbanda Lima, the first publicly visible intersex activist in Portugal
- Molly McGlynn, Canadian film and television director and screenwriter
- Sheena Metal, U.S. talk-show host
- Mani Mitchell, New Zealand intersex activist, researcher/presenter of the movie Intersexion
- Nthabiseng Mokoena, South African intersex activist
- Iain Morland, British author and music technologist
- Esther Morris Leidolf, U.S. activist and founder of MRKH Organization, and author of The Missing Vagina Monologue

=== N ===
- Nancy Navalta, Filipino track and field athlete
- Annet Negesa, Ugandan middle-distance runner
- Maria Nikiforova, Ukrainian anarchist revolutionary
- Francine Niyonsaba, Burundian 800 metres runner

=== O ===
- AJ Odasso, American author, editor, and poet
- Hanne Gaby Odiele, Belgian model
- Sogto Ochirov, Russian intersex activist, archer and shepherd

=== P ===
- Pidgeon Pagonis, U.S. intersex artist and activist, nominated as a 2015 Whitehouse LGBT Champion of Change
- Dee Palmer, English composer and keyboardist, best known for membership in Jethro Tull
- Pinki Pramanik, Indian track athlete
- Florencio Pla Meseguer, Spanish guerrilla fighter in the Spanish Civil War
- Casimir Pulaski, Polish-American military commander thought to have an intersex trait

=== R ===
- Kristian Ranđelović, Serbian and Balkan intersex and transgender activist
- Heinrich Ratjen (also known as Dora Ratjen) (1918–2008), German athlete
- Jemma Redmond (1978–2016), Irish biotechnologist and innovator
- Esan Regmi, Nepali intersex human rights activist
- Veronique Renard, Dutch author and visual artist
- Alicia Roth Weigel, American activist
- Ana Roxanne, American musician and singer
- Eliana Rubashkyn, Colombian, New Zealand pharmacist, activist and gender refugee
- Mark Errin Rust, Australian serial sex murderer

=== S ===
- Sa Bangji, Korean intersex person
- Nicole Santamaría, Salvadoran human rights activist
- Erik Schinegger, alpine skier
- Scout Schultz, a student at the Georgia Institute of Technology, Georgia, U.S., who was shot dead by police on September 16, 2017
- Caster Semenya, South African middle-distance runner and Olympic gold medalist
- Edinanci Silva, Brazilian judoka and gold medalist in the woman's half-heavyweight division at the Pan-American games
- Dawn Langley Simmons (1937 or 1922–2000), English author and biographer
- Jim Sinclair, autism rights activist
- Witold Smętek, Polish athlete and record holder
- Salvador Sobral, Portuguese singer, who won the Eurovision Song Contest 2017 for Portugal
- Rivers Solomon (born 1989), American author
- Georgina Somerset (née Turtle) (1923–2013), first openly intersex person in the UK; active in the media from the mid-1960s
- Anick Soni, award-winning British Asian intersex activist and Fellow of the Royal Society of Arts
- Santhi Soundarajan, Indian athlete
- Pedro Spajari, Brazilian swimmer
- Octavia St. Laurent, American model and AIDS educator
- Levi Suydam, 19th century U.S. intersex person

=== T ===
- Bogi Takács, Hungarian poet and writer

=== V ===
- Esteban de Valdaracete (born 1496), Spanish fencing teacher
- Vijayarajamallika, Indian transgender poet
- Laura Vila Kremer, Catalan performance artist and intersex rights activist
- Hida Viloria, American queer, genderfluid intersex writer, activist, and author of Born Both: An Intersex Life (Hachette Books); founding director of Intersex Campaign for Equality; appears in the films Gendernauts and Intersexion
- Del LaGrace Volcano, U.S./Sweden, visual artist and speaker on queer and intersex issues (e.g. the Critical Sexology Seminars, London)
- Christiane Völling, Germany, thought to be the first person to successfully sue in a case of medical treatment without consent

=== W ===
- Stanisława Walasiewicz, also known as Stella Walsh, a Polish Olympic athlete and medal winner in the 1930s
- Sean Saifa Wall, African American intersex and anti-racist activist
- Margaret Wambui, Kenyan middle-distance runner
- Mark Weston (1905–1978), UK field athlete
- Gigi Raven Wilbur, U.S. bisexuality rights activist
- Gina Wilson, activist and founder president of Intersex Human Rights Australia
- Yael van der Wouden (born 1987), Dutch writer

=== X ===
- Xie Jianshun, Taiwanese soldier

=== Z ===
- Leopold Zahn, Austrian author and art historian
- Leonne Zeegers, the first person in the Netherlands to have a passport with an "X" gender marker
- Reuben Zellman, U.S. intersex and transgender rabbi and musician
- Kimberly Zieselman, U.S. advocate, attorney, and executive director of interACT
- Dana Zzyym, U.S. non-binary intersex activist and Associate Director of Intersex Campaign for Equality. In 2021, Zzyym became the first U.S. citizen to have an official passport with "X" gender marker after suing the U.S. State Department for a gender-neutral passport in Zzyym v. Pompeo.

== See also ==
- Intersex civil society organizations
- List of fictional intersex characters
- List of researchers on intersex issues
- List of non-binary people
- List of transgender people
- List of disability rights activists
