= Androgen insensitivity syndrome =

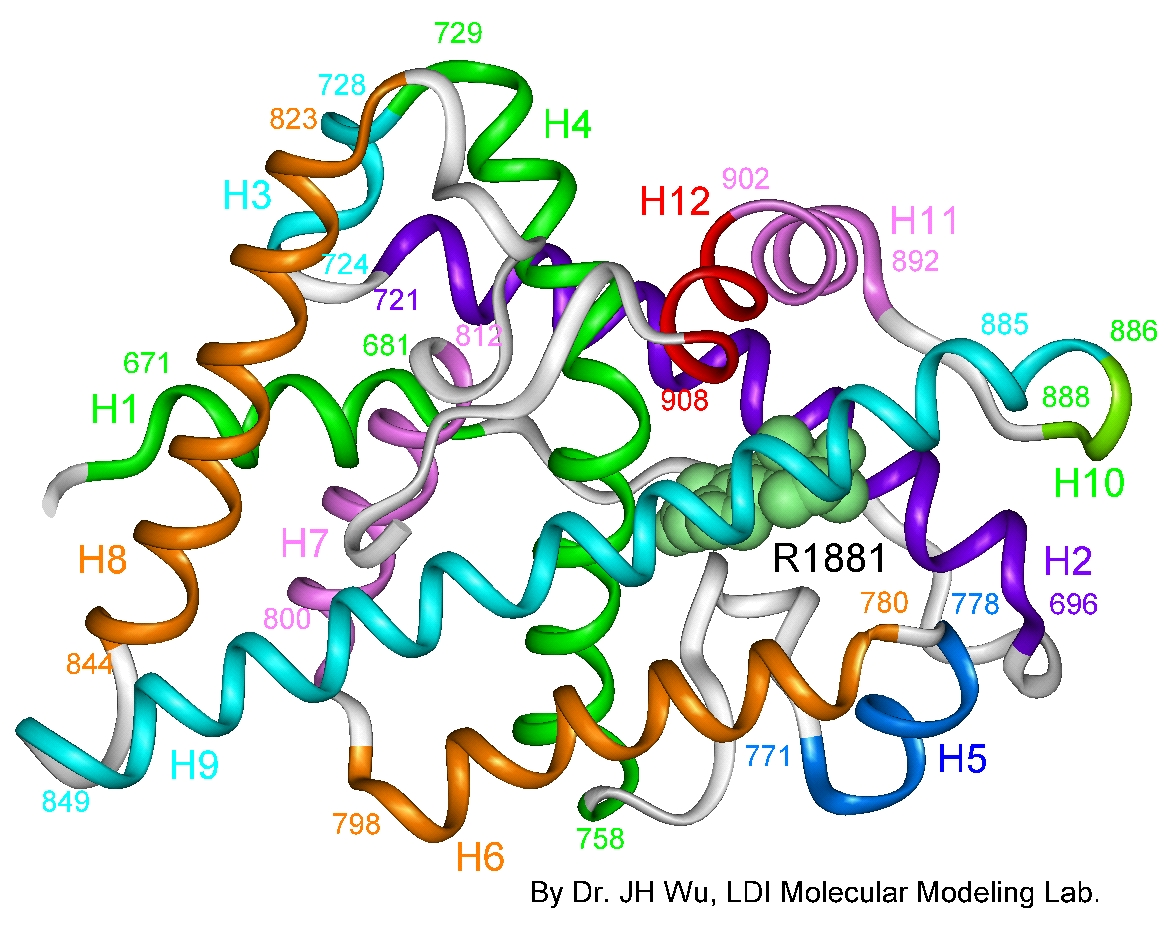
- AIS results when the function of the androgen receptor (AR) is impaired. The AR protein (pictured) mediates the effects of androgens in the human body.
- Specialty: Endocrinology

Androgen insensitivity syndrome (AIS) is a condition involving the inability to respond to androgens, typically due to androgen receptor dysfunction.

It affects 1 in 20,000 to 64,000 XY (karyotypically male) births. The condition results in the partial or complete inability of cells to respond to androgens. This unresponsiveness can impair or prevent the development of male genitals, as well as impairing or preventing the development of male secondary sexual characteristics at puberty. It does not significantly impair female genital or sexual development. The insensitivity to androgens is therefore clinically significant only when it occurs in genetic males, (i.e. individuals with a Y-chromosome, or more specifically, an SRY gene). Clinical phenotypes in these individuals range from a typical male habitus with mild spermatogenic defect or reduced secondary terminal hair, to a full female habitus, despite the presence of a Y-chromosome.

AIS is divided into three categories that are differentiated by the degree of genital masculinization:

- Mild androgen insensitivity syndrome (MAIS) is indicated when the external genitalia are those of a typical male (a penis and a scrotum)
- Partial androgen insensitivity syndrome (PAIS) is indicated when the external genitalia are partially, but not fully, masculinized
- Complete androgen insensitivity syndrome (CAIS) is indicated when the external genitalia are those of a typical female (a vulva)

Androgen insensitivity syndrome is the largest single entity that leads to 46,XY undermasculinized genitalia.

Management of AIS is currently limited to symptomatic management; no method is currently available to correct the malfunctioning androgen receptor proteins produced by AR gene mutations. Areas of management include sex assignment, genitoplasty, gonadectomy to reduce tumor risk, hormone replacement therapy, genetic counseling, and psychological counseling.

== Genetics ==
Location and structure of the human androgen receptor: Top, the AR gene is located on the proximal long arm of the X chromosome. Middle, the eight exons are separated by introns of various lengths. Bottom, illustration of the AR protein, with primary functional domains labeled (not representative of actual 3-D structure).

The human androgen receptor (AR) is a protein encoded by a gene located on the proximal long arm of the X chromosome (locus Xq11-Xq12). The protein coding region consists of approximately 2,757 nucleotides spanning eight exons. Like other nuclear receptors, the AR protein consists of several functional domains: the transactivation domain (also called the transcription-regulation domain or the NH2-terminal domain), the DNA-binding domain, the hinge region, and the steroid-binding domain (also called the carboxyl-terminal ligand-binding domain). The transactivation domain is encoded by exon 1, and makes up more than half of the AR protein. Exons 2 and 3 encode the DNA-binding domain, while the 5' portion of exon 4 encodes the hinge region. The remainder of exons 4 through 8 encodes the ligand binding domain.

=== Trinucleotide satellite lengths and AR transcriptional activity ===
The AR gene contains two polymorphic trinucleotide microsatellites in exon 1. The first microsatellite (nearest the 5' end) contains 8 to 60 repetitions of the glutamine codon "CAG" and is thus known as the polyglutamine tract. The second microsatellite contains 4 to 31 repetitions of the glycine codon "GGC" and is known as the polyglycine tract. The average number of repetitions varies by ethnicity, with Caucasians exhibiting an average of 21 CAG repeats, and Blacks 18. In men, disease states are associated with extremes in polyglutamine tract length; prostate cancer, hepatocellular carcinoma, and intellectual disability are associated with too few repetitions, while spinal and bulbar muscular atrophy (SBMA) is associated with a CAG repetition length of 40 or more. Some studies indicate that the length of the polyglutamine tract is inversely correlated with transcriptional activity in the AR protein, and that longer polyglutamine tracts may be associated with male infertility and undermasculinized genitalia in men. However, other studies have indicated no such correlation exists. A comprehensive meta-analysis of the subject published in 2007 supports the existence of the correlation, and concluded these discrepancies could be resolved when sample size and study design are taken into account. Some studies suggest longer polyglycine tract lengths are also associated with genital masculinization defects in men. Other studies find no such association.

=== AR mutations ===
As of 2010, over 400 AR mutations have been reported in the AR mutation database, and the number continues to grow. Inheritance is typically maternal and follows an X-linked recessive pattern; individuals with a 46,XY karyotype always express the mutant gene since they have only one X chromosome, whereas 46,XX carriers are minimally affected. About 30% of the time, the AR mutation is a spontaneous result, and is not inherited. Such de novo mutations are the result of a germ cell mutation or germ cell mosaicism in the gonads of one of the parents, or a mutation in the fertilized egg itself. In one study, three of eight de novo mutations occurred in the postzygotic stage, leading to the estimate that up to one-third of de novo mutations result in somatic mosaicism. Not every mutation of the AR gene results in androgen insensitivity; one particular mutation occurs in 8 to 14% of genetic males, and is thought to adversely affect only a small number of individuals when other genetic factors are present.

=== Other causes ===
Some individuals with CAIS or PAIS do not have any AR mutations despite clinical, hormonal, and histological features sufficient to warrant an AIS diagnosis; up to 5% of women with CAIS do not have an AR mutation, as well as between 27 and 72% of individuals with PAIS.

In one patient, the underlying cause for presumptive PAIS was a mutant steroidogenic factor-1 (SF-1) protein. In another patient, CAIS was the result of a deficit in the transmission of a transactivating signal from the N-terminal region of the androgen receptor to the basal transcription machinery of the cell. A coactivator protein interacting with the activation function 1 (AF-1) transactivation domain of the androgen receptor may have been deficient in this patient. The signal disruption could not be corrected by supplementation with any coactivators known at the time, nor was the absent coactivator protein characterized, which left some in the field unconvinced that a mutant coactivator would explain the mechanism of androgen resistance in CAIS or PAIS patients with a typical AR gene.

=== XY karyotype ===
Depending on the mutation, a person with a 46,XY karyotype and AIS can have either a male (MAIS) or female (CAIS) phenotype, or may have genitalia that are only partially masculinized (PAIS). The gonads are testes regardless of phenotype due to the influence of the Y chromosome. A 46,XY female, thus, does not have ovaries, and can not contribute an egg towards conception. In some cases, 46, XY females do form a vestigial uterus and have been able to gestate children. Such examples are rare and have required the use of an egg donor, hormone therapy, and IVF.

Several case studies of fertile 46,XY males with AIS have been published, although this group is thought to be a minority. In some cases, infertile males with MAIS have been able to conceive children after increasing their sperm count through the use of supplementary testosterone.

A genetic male conceived by a man with AIS would not receive his father's X chromosome, thus would neither inherit nor carry the gene for the syndrome. A genetic female conceived in such a way would receive her father's X chromosome, thus would become a carrier.

=== XX karyotype ===
Genetic females (46,XX karyotype) have two X chromosomes, thus have two AR genes. A mutation in one (but not both) results in a minimally affected, fertile, female carrier. Some carriers have been noted to have slightly reduced body hair, delayed puberty, and/or tall stature, presumably due to skewed X-inactivation. A female carrier will pass the affected AR gene to her children 50% of the time. If the affected child is a genetic female, she, too, will be a carrier. An affected 46,XY child will have AIS.

A genetic female with mutations in both AR genes could theoretically result from the union of a fertile man with AIS and a female carrier of the gene, or from de novo mutation. However, given the scarcity of fertile AIS men and low incidence of AR mutation, the chances of this occurrence are small. The phenotype of such an individual is a matter of speculation; as of 2010, no such documented case has been published.

=== Correlation of genotype and phenotype ===
Individuals with partial AIS, unlike those with the complete or mild forms, present at birth with ambiguous genitalia, and the decision to raise the child as male or female is often not obvious. Unfortunately, little information regarding phenotype can be gleaned from precise knowledge of the AR mutation itself; the same AR mutation may cause significant variation in the degree of masculinization in different individuals, even among members of the same family. Exactly what causes this variation is not entirely understood, although factors contributing to it could include the lengths of the polyglutamine and polyglycine tracts, sensitivity to and variations in the intrauterine endocrine milieu, the effect of coregulatory proteins active in Sertoli cells, somatic mosaicism, expression of the 5RD2 gene in genital skin fibroblasts, reduced AR transcription and translation from factors other than mutations in the AR coding region, an unidentified coactivator protein, enzyme deficiencies such as 21-hydroxylase deficiency, or other genetic variations such as a mutant steroidogenic factor-1 protein. The degree of variation, however, does not appear to be constant across all AR mutations, and is much more extreme in some. Missense mutations that result in a single amino acid substitution are known to produce the most phenotypic diversity.

== Pathophysiology ==
Normal function of the androgen receptor: Testosterone (T) enters the cell and, if 5-alpha-reductase is present, is converted into dihydrotestone (DHT). Upon steroid binding, the androgen receptor (AR) undergoes a conformational change and releases heat shock proteins (hsps). Phosphorylation (P) occurs before or after steroid binding. The AR translocates to the nucleus where dimerization, DNA binding, and the recruitment of coactivators occur. Target genes are transcribed (mRNA) and translated into proteins.

=== Androgens and the androgen receptor ===
The effects that androgens have on the human body (virilization, masculinization, anabolism, etc.) are not brought about by androgens themselves, but rather are the result of androgens bound to androgen receptors; the androgen receptor mediates the effects of androgens in the human body. Likewise, the androgen receptor itself is generally inactive in the cell until androgen binding occurs.

The following series of steps illustrates how androgens and the androgen receptor work together to produce androgenic effects:

1. Androgen enters the cell.
  1. Only certain organs in the body, such as the gonads and the adrenal glands, produce the androgen testosterone.
  2. Testosterone is converted into dihydrotestosterone, a chemically similar androgen, in cells containing the enzyme 5-alpha reductase.
  3. Both androgens exert their influence through binding with the androgen receptor.
2. Androgen binds with the androgen receptor.
  1. The androgen receptor is expressed ubiquitously throughout the tissues of the human body.
  2. Before it binds with an androgen, the androgen receptor is bound to heat shock proteins.
  3. These heat shock proteins are released upon androgen binding.
  4. Androgen binding induces a stabilizing, conformational change in the androgen receptor.
  5. The two zinc fingers of the DNA-binding domain are exposed as a result of this new conformation.
  6. AR stability is thought to be aided by type II coregulators, which modulate protein folding and androgen binding, or facilitate NH2/carboxyl-terminal interaction.
3. The hormone-activated androgen receptor is phosphorylated.
  1. Receptor phosphorylation can occur before androgen binding, although the presence of androgen promotes hyperphosphorylation.
  2. The biological ramifications of receptor phosphorylation are unknown.
4. The hormone-activated androgen receptor translocates to the nucleus.
  1. Nucleocytoplasmic transport is in part facilitated by an amino acid sequence on the AR called the nuclear localization signal.
  2. The AR's nuclear localization signal is primarily encoded in the hinge region of the AR gene.
5. Homodimerization occurs.
  1. Dimerization is mediated by the second (nearest the 3' end) zinc finger.
6. DNA binding to regulatory androgen response elements occurs.
  1. Target genes contain (or are flanked by) transcriptional enhancer nucleotide sequences that interact with the first zinc finger.
  2. These areas are called androgen response elements.
7. Coactivators are recruited by the AR.
  1. Type I coactivators (i.e., coregulators) are thought to influence AR transcriptional activity by facilitating DNA occupancy, chromatin remodeling, or the recruitment of general transcription factors associated with RNA polymerase II holocomplex.
8. Target gene transcription ensues.

In this way, androgens bound to androgen receptors regulate the expression of target genes, thus produce androgenic effects.

Theoretically, certain mutant androgen receptors can function without androgens; in vitro studies have demonstrated that a mutant androgen receptor protein can induce transcription in the absence of androgen if its steroid binding domain is deleted. Conversely, the steroid-binding domain may act to repress the AR transactivation domain, perhaps due to the AR's unliganded conformation.

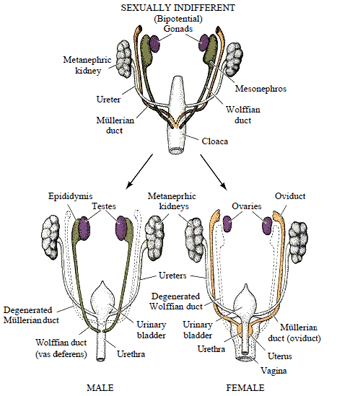
Sexual differentiation: The human embryo has indifferent sex accessory ducts until the seventh week of development.

=== Androgens in fetal development ===
Human embryos develop similarly for the first six weeks, regardless of genetic sex (46,XX or 46,XY karyotype); the only way to tell the difference between 46,XX or 46,XY embryos during this time period is to look for Barr bodies or a Y chromosome. The gonads begin as bulges of tissue called the genital ridges at the back of the abdominal cavity, near the midline. By the fifth week, the genital ridges differentiate into an outer cortex and an inner medulla, and are called indifferent gonads. By the sixth week, the indifferent gonads begin to differentiate according to genetic sex. If the karyotype is 46,XY, testes develop due to the influence of the Y chromosome's SRY gene. This process does not require the presence of androgen, nor a functional androgen receptor.

Until around the seventh week of development, the embryo has indifferent sex accessory ducts, which consist of two pairs of ducts: the Müllerian ducts and the Wolffian ducts. Sertoli cells within the testes secrete anti-Müllerian hormone around this time to suppress the development of the Müllerian ducts, and cause their degeneration. Without this anti-Müllerian hormone, the Müllerian ducts develop into the female internal genitalia (uterus, cervix, fallopian tubes, and upper vaginal barrel). Unlike the Müllerian ducts, the Wolffian ducts will not continue to develop by default. In the presence of testosterone and functional androgen receptors, the Wolffian ducts develop into the epididymides, vasa deferentia, and seminal vesicles. If the testes fail to secrete testosterone, or the androgen receptors do not function properly, the Wolffian ducts degenerate.

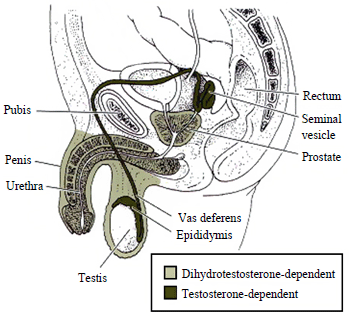
Masculinization of the male genitalia is dependent on both testosterone and dihydrotestosterone.

Masculinization of the male external genitalia (the penis, penile urethra, and scrotum), as well as the prostate, are dependent on the androgen dihydrotestosterone. Testosterone is converted into dihydrotestosterone by the 5-alpha reductase enzyme. If this enzyme is absent or deficient, then dihydrotestosterone is not created, and the external male genitalia do not develop properly. As is the case with the internal male genitalia, a functional androgen receptor is needed for dihydrotestosterone to regulate the transcription of target genes involved in development.

=== Pathogenesis of AIS ===
Mutations in the androgen receptor gene can cause problems with any of the steps involved in androgenization, from the synthesis of the androgen receptor protein itself, through the transcriptional ability of the dimerized, androgen-AR complex. AIS can result if even one of these steps is significantly disrupted, as each step is required for androgens to activate the AR successfully and regulate gene expression. Exactly which steps a particular mutation will impair can be predicted, to some extent, by identifying the area of the AR in which the mutation resides. This predictive ability is primarily retrospective in origin; the different functional domains of the AR gene have been elucidated by analyzing the effects of specific mutations in different regions of the AR. For example, mutations in the steroid binding domain have been known to affect androgen binding affinity or retention, mutations in the hinge region have been known to affect nuclear translocation, mutations in the DNA-binding domain have been known to affect dimerization and binding to target DNA, and mutations in the transactivation domain have been known to affect target gene transcription regulation. Unfortunately, even when the affected functional domain is known, predicting the phenotypical consequences of a particular mutation (see Correlation of genotype and phenotype) is difficult.

Some mutations can adversely impact more than one functional domain. For example, a mutation in one functional domain can have deleterious effects on another by altering the way in which the domains interact. A single mutation can affect all downstream functional domains if a premature stop codon or framing error results; such a mutation can result in a completely unusable (or unsynthesizable) androgen receptor protein. The steroid binding domain is particularly vulnerable to the effects of a premature stop codon or framing error, since it occurs at the end of the gene, and its information is thus more likely to be truncated or misinterpreted than other functional domains.

Other, more complex relationships have been observed as a consequence of mutated AR; some mutations associated with male phenotypes have been linked to male breast cancer, prostate cancer, or in the case of spinal and bulbar muscular atrophy, disease of the central nervous system. The form of breast cancer seen in some men with PAIS is caused by a mutation in the AR's DNA-binding domain. This mutation is thought to cause a disturbance of the AR's target gene interaction that allows it to act at certain additional targets, possibly in conjunction with the estrogen receptor protein, to cause cancerous growth. The pathogenesis of spinal and bulbar muscular atrophy (SBMA) demonstrates that even the mutant AR protein itself can result in pathology. The trinucleotide repeat expansion of the polyglutamine tract of the AR gene that is associated with SBMA results in the synthesis of a misfolded AR protein that the cell fails to proteolyze and disperse properly. These misfolded AR proteins form aggregates in the cell cytoplasm and nucleus. Over the course of 30 to 50 years, these aggregates accumulate and have a cytotoxic effect, eventually resulting in the neurodegenerative symptoms associated with SBMA.

== Diagnosis ==
The phenotypes that result from the insensitivity to androgens are not unique to AIS, thus the diagnosis of AIS requires thorough exclusion of other causes. Clinical findings indicative of AIS include the presence of a short vagina or undermasculinized genitalia, partial or complete regression of Müllerian structures, bilateral nondysplastic testes, and impaired spermatogenesis and/or virilization. Laboratory findings include a 46,XY karyotype and typical or elevated postpubertal testosterone, luteinizing hormone, and estradiol levels. The androgen binding activity of genital skin fibroblasts is typically diminished, although exceptions have been reported. Conversion of testosterone to dihydrotestosterone may be impaired. The diagnosis of AIS is confirmed if androgen receptor gene sequencing reveals a mutation, although not all individuals with AIS (particularly PAIS) will have an AR mutation (see Other Causes).

Each of the three types of AIS (complete, partial, and mild) has a different list of differential diagnoses to consider. However, cases have been reported of individuals with both AIS and certain diagnoses listed here, such as Klinefelter syndrome or Turner syndrome with mosaicism. Depending on the form of AIS suspected, the list of differentials can include:

- Chromosomal anomalies:
  - Klinefelter syndrome (47,XXY karyotype)
  - Turner syndrome (45,XO karyotype)
  - Mixed gonadal dysgenesis (45,XO/46,XY karyotype)
  - Tetragametic chimerism (46,XX/46,XY karyotype)
- Androgen biosynthetic dysfunction in 46,XY individuals:
  - Luteinizing hormone (LH) receptor mutations
  - Smith–Lemli–Opitz syndrome (associated with intellectual disability)
  - Lipoid congenital adrenal hyperplasia
  - 3β-hydroxysteroid dehydrogenase 2 deficiency
  - 17α-hydroxylase deficiency
  - 17,20 lyase deficiency
  - 17β-hydroxysteroid dehydrogenase deficiency
  - 5α-reductase deficiency
- Androgen excess in 46,XX individuals:
  - 21-hydroxylase deficiency
  - 3β-hydroxysteroid dehydrogenase 2 deficiency
  - Cytochrome P450 oxidoreductase deficiency (disorder in mother causes 46,XX fetal virilization)
  - 11β-hydroxylase deficiency
  - Aromatase deficiency
  - Glucocorticoid receptor mutations
  - Maternal virilizing tumor (e.g. luteoma)
  - Increased androgen exposure in utero, not otherwise specified (e.g. androgenic drugs)
- Developmental
  - Mayer–Rokitansky–Küster–Hauser syndrome (46,XX karyotype)
  - Swyer syndrome (46,XY karyotype)
  - XX gonadal dysgenesis (46,XX karyotype)
  - Leydig cell agenesis or hypoplasia, not otherwise specified (46,XY karyotype)
  - Absent (vanishing) testes syndrome
  - Ovotesticular DSD
  - Testicular DSD (i.e. 46,XX sex reversal)
- Teratogenic causes (e.g. estrogens, antiestrogens)
- Other causes:
  - Frasier syndrome (associated with progressive glomerulopathy)
  - Denys–Drash syndrome (associated with nephropathy and Wilms tumor)
  - WAGR syndrome (associated with Wilms tumor and aniridia)
  - McKusick–Kaufman syndrome (associated with postaxial polydactyly)
  - Robinow syndrome (associated with dwarfism)
  - Aarskog–Scott syndrome (associated with facial anomalies)
  - Hand-foot-genital syndrome (associated with limb malformations)
  - Popliteal pterygium syndrome (associated with extensive webbing behind knees)
  - Kallmann syndrome (often associated with anosmia)
  - Hypospadias not otherwise specified
  - Cryptorchidism not otherwise specified
  - vaginal atresia not otherwise specified

=== Classification ===
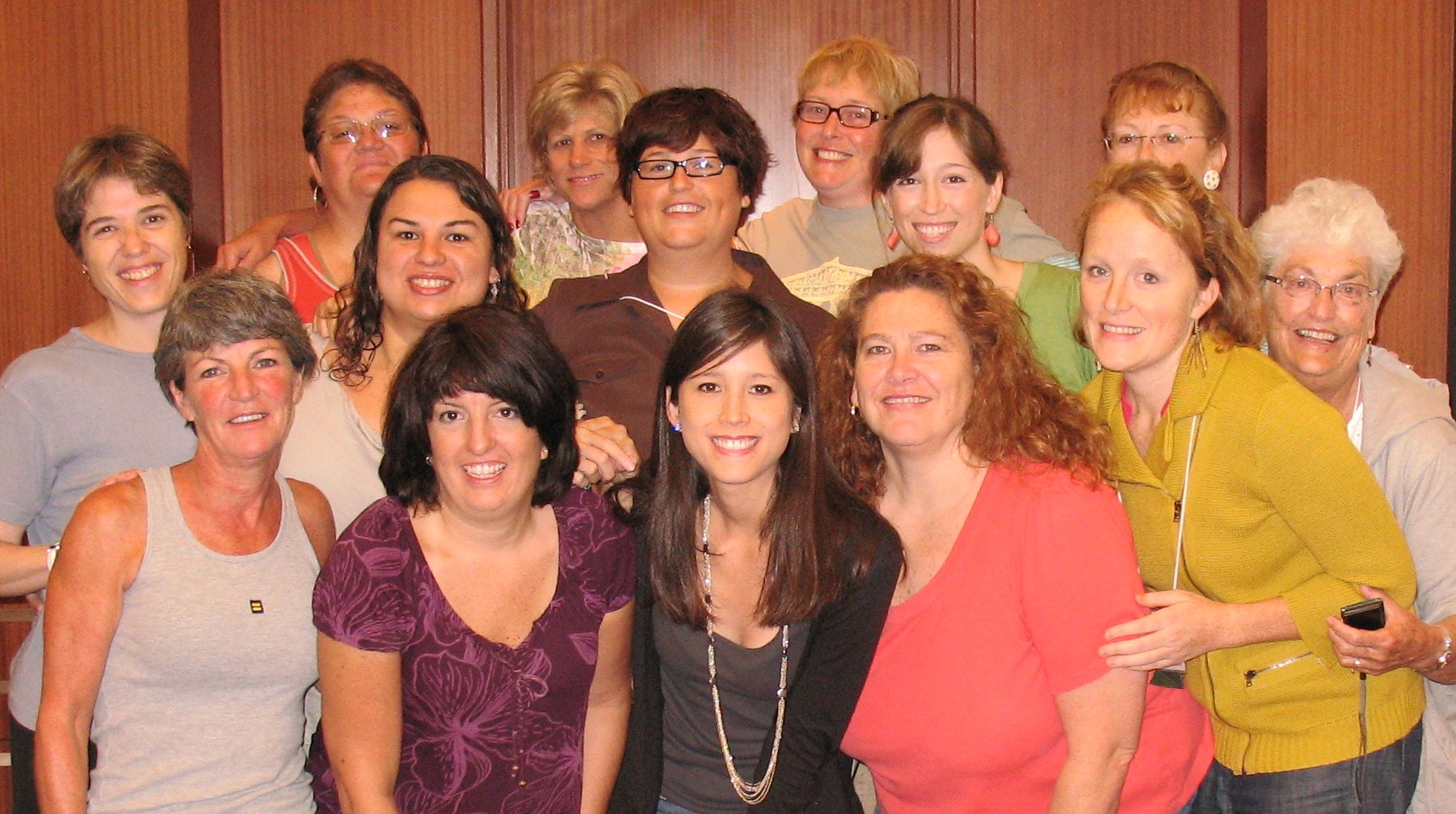
Individuals with AIS and related DSD/intersex conditions

AIS is broken down into three classes based on phenotype: complete androgen insensitivity syndrome (CAIS), partial androgen insensitivity syndrome (PAIS), and mild androgen insensitivity syndrome (MAIS). A supplemental system of phenotypic grading that uses seven classes instead of the traditional three was proposed by pediatric endocrinologist Charmian A. Quigley et al. in 1995. The first six grades of the scale, grades 1 through 6, are differentiated by the degree of genital masculinization; grade 1 is indicated when the external genitalia is fully masculinized, grade 6 is indicated when the external genitalia is fully feminized, and grades 2 through 5 quantify four degrees of decreasingly masculinized genitalia that lie in the interim. Grade 7 is indistinguishable from grade 6 until puberty, and is thereafter differentiated by the presence of secondary terminal hair; grade 6 is indicated when secondary terminal hair is present, whereas grade 7 is indicated when it is absent. The Quigley scale can be used in conjunction with the traditional three classes of AIS to provide additional information regarding the degree of genital masculinization, and is particularly useful when the diagnosis is PAIS.

== Management ==
Management of AIS is currently limited to symptomatic management; no method is currently available to correct the malfunctioning androgen receptor proteins produced by AR gene mutations. Areas of management include sex assignment, genitoplasty, gonadectomy in relation to tumor risk, hormone replacement therapy, genetic counseling, and psychological counseling.

== Epidemiology ==
AIS represents about 15–20% of DSDs and affects 1 in 20,000 to 1 in 64,000 males.

Estimates for the incidence of androgen insensitivity syndrome are based on a relatively small population size, thus are known to be imprecise. CAIS is estimated to occur in one of every 20,400 46,XY births. A nationwide survey in the Netherlands based on patients with genetic confirmation of the diagnosis estimates that the minimal incidence of CAIS is one in 99,000. The incidence of PAIS is estimated to be one in 130,000. Due to its subtle presentation, MAIS is not typically investigated except in the case of male infertility, thus its true prevalence is unknown.

== Controversy ==
=== Preimplantation genetic diagnosis ===
Preimplantation genetic diagnosis (PGD or PIGD) refers to genetic profiling of embryos prior to implantation (as a form of embryo profiling), and sometimes even of oocytes prior to fertilization. When used to screen for a specific genetic sequence, its main advantage is that it avoids selective pregnancy termination, as the method makes it highly likely that a selected embryo will be free of the condition under consideration.

In the UK, AIS appears on a list of serious genetic diseases that may be screened for via PGD. Some ethicists, clinicians, and intersex advocates have argued that screening embryos to specifically exclude intersex traits is based on social and cultural norms as opposed to medical necessity.

== History ==
Recorded descriptions of the effects of AIS date back hundreds of years, although significant understanding of its underlying histopathology did not occur until the 1950s. The taxonomy and nomenclature associated with androgen insensitivity went through a significant evolution that paralleled this understanding.

=== Timeline of major milestones ===
- 1950: Lawson Wilkins administers daily methyltestosterone to a karyotype 46,XY female patient, who shows no signs of virilization. His experiment is the first documented demonstration of the pathophysiology of AIS.
- 1970: Mary F. Lyon and Susan Hawkes reported that a gene on the X chromosome caused complete insensitivity to androgens in mice.
- 1981: Barbara Migeon et al. narrowed down the locus of the human androgen receptor gene (or a factor controlling the androgen receptor gene) to somewhere between Xq11 and Xq13.
- 1988: The human androgen receptor gene is first cloned and partially analyzed by multiple parties. Terry Brown et al. reported the first mutations proven to cause AIS.
- 1989: Terry Brown et al. reported the exact locus of the AR gene (Xq11-Xq12), and Dennis Lubahn et al. published its intron-exon boundaries.
- 1994: The androgen receptor gene mutations database was created to provide a comprehensive listing of mutations published in medical journals and conference proceedings.

=== Early terminology ===
The first descriptions of the effects of AIS appeared in the medical literature as individual case reports or as part of a comprehensive description of intersex physicalities. In 1779, William Hunter studied a few freemartins. One of them, "Mr. Wright's Free-Martin", was likely not a freemartin, but a case of testicular feminization. In 1839, Scottish obstetrician Sir James Young Simpson published one such description in an exhaustive study of intersexuality that has been credited with advancing the medical community's understanding of the subject. Simpson's system of taxonomy, however, was far from the first; taxonomies or descriptions for the classification of intersexuality were developed by Italian physician and physicist Fortuné Affaitati in 1549, French surgeon Ambroise Paré in 1573, French physician and sexology pioneer Nicolas Venette in 1687 (under the pseudonym Vénitien Salocini), and French zoologist Isidore Geoffroy Saint-Hilaire in 1832. All five of these authors used the colloquial term "hermaphrodite" as the foundation of their taxonomies, although Simpson himself questioned the propriety of the word in his publication. Use of the word "hermaphrodite" in the medical literature has persisted to this day, although its propriety is still in question. An alternative system of nomenclature has been recently suggested, but the subject of exactly which word or words should be used in its place still one of much debate.

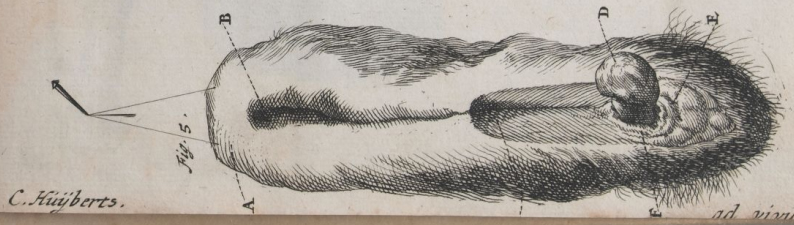
"Pudenda pseudo-hermaphroditi ovini." Illustration of ambiguous genitalia from Frederik Ruysch's Thesaurus Anitomicus Octavius, 1709.

=== Pseudohermaphroditism ===
"Pseudohermaphroditism" has, until very recently, been the term used in the medical literature to describe the condition of an individual whose gonads do not match the expected external genitalia in of their sex. For example, 46,XY individuals who have a female phenotype, but also have testes instead of ovaries—a group that includes all individuals with CAIS, as well as some individuals with PAIS—are classified as having "male pseudohermaphroditism", while individuals with both an ovary and a testis (or at least one ovotestis) are classified as having "true hermaphroditism". Use of the word in the medical literature antedates the discovery of the chromosome, thus its definition has not always taken karyotype into account when determining an individual's sex. Previous definitions of "pseudohermaphroditism" relied on perceived inconsistencies between the internal and external organs; the "true" sex of an individual was determined by the internal organs, and the external organs determined the "perceived" sex of an individual.

German-Swiss pathologist Edwin Klebs is sometimes noted for using the word "pseudohermaphroditism" in his taxonomy of intersexuality in 1876, although the word is clearly not his invention as is sometimes reported; the history of the word "pseudohermaphrodite" and the corresponding desire to separate "true" hermaphrodites from "false", "spurious", or "pseudo" hermaphrodites, dates back to at least 1709, when Dutch anatomist Frederik Ruysch used it in a publication describing a subject with testes and a mostly female phenotype. "Pseudohermaphrodite" also appeared in the Acta Eruditorum later that same year, in a review of Ruysch's work. Also some evidence indicates the word was already being used by the German and French medical community long before Klebs used it; German physiologist Johannes Peter Müller equated "pseudohermaphroditism" with a subclass of hermaphroditism from Saint-Hilaire's taxonomy in a publication dated 1834, and by the 1840s "pseudohermaphroditism" was appearing in several French and German publications, including dictionaries.

=== Testicular feminization ===
In 1953, American gynecologist John Morris provided the first full description of what he called "testicular feminization syndrome" based on 82 cases compiled from the medical literature, including two of his own patients. The term "testicular feminization" was coined to reflect Morris' observation that the testicles in these patients produced a hormone that had a feminizing effect on the body, a phenomenon now understood to be due to the inaction of androgens, and subsequent aromatization of testosterone into estrogen. A few years before Morris published his landmark paper, Lawson Wilkins had shown through experiment that unresponsiveness of the target cell to the action of androgenic hormones was a cause of "male pseudohermaphroditism". Wilkins' work, which clearly demonstrated the lack of a therapeutic effect when 46,XY patients were treated with androgens, caused a gradual shift in nomenclature from "testicular feminization" to "androgen resistance".

=== Other names ===
A distinct name has been given to many of the various presentations of AIS, such as Reifenstein syndrome (1947), Goldberg-Maxwell syndrome (1948), Morris' syndrome (1953), Gilbert-Dreyfus syndrome (1957), Lub's syndrome (1959), "incomplete testicular feminization" (1963), Rosewater syndrome (1965), and Aiman's syndrome (1979). Since it was not understood that these different presentations were all caused by the same set of mutations in the androgen receptor gene, a unique name was given to each new combination of symptoms, resulting in a complicated stratification of seemingly disparate disorders.

Over the last 60 years, as reports of strikingly different phenotypes were reported to occur even among members of the same family, and as steady progress was made towards the understanding of the underlying molecular pathogenesis of AIS, these disorders were found to be different phenotypic expressions of one syndrome caused by molecular defects in the androgen receptor gene.

AIS is now the accepted terminology for the syndromes resulting from unresponsiveness of the target cell to the action of androgenic hormones. CAIS encompasses the phenotypes previously described by "testicular feminization", Morris' syndrome, and Goldberg-Maxwell syndrome; PAIS includes Reifenstein syndrome, Gilbert-Dreyfus syndrome, Lub's syndrome, "incomplete testicular feminization", and Rosewater syndrome; and MAIS includes Aiman's syndrome.

The more virilized phenotypes of AIS have sometimes been described as "undervirilized male syndrome", "infertile male syndrome", "undervirilized fertile male syndrome", etc., before evidence was reported that these conditions were caused by mutations in the AR gene. These diagnoses were used to describe a variety of mild defects in virilization; as a result, the phenotypes of some men who have been diagnosed as such are better described by PAIS (e.g. micropenis, hypospadias, and undescended testes), while others are better described by MAIS (e.g. isolated male infertility or gynecomastia).

== Society and culture ==
In the film Orchids, My Intersex Adventure, Phoebe Hart and her sister Bonnie Hart, both women with CAIS, documented their exploration of AIS and other intersex issues.

Recording artist Dalea is a Hispanic-American activist who is public about her CAIS. She has given interviews about her condition and founded Girl Comet, a non-profit diversity awareness and inspiration initiative.

In 2017, fashion model Hanne Gaby Odiele disclosed that they were born with androgen insensitivity syndrome. As a child, they underwent medical procedures relating to the condition, which they said took place without their or their parents' informed consent. They were told about their intersex condition weeks before beginning their modelling career.

In the 1991 Japanese horror novel Ring and its sequels, by Koji Suzuki (later adapted into Japanese, Korean, and American films), the central antagonist Sadako has this syndrome, as revealed by Dr Nagao when confronted by Ryuji and Asakawa. Sadako's condition is referred to by the earlier name "testicular feminisation syndrome".

In season 2, episode 13 ("Skin Deep") of the TV series House, the main patient's cancerous testicle is mistaken for an ovary due to the patient's undiscovered CAIS. The episode has been criticized for its medical inaccuracy as well as its stigmatizing and offensive portrayal of CAIS.

In season 2 of the MTV series Faking It, a character has CAIS. The character, Lauren Cooper, played by Bailey De Young, was the first intersex series regular on American television.

In season 8, episode 11 ("Delko for the Defense") of the TV series CSI: Miami, the primary suspect has AIS which gets him off a rape charge.

In series 8, episode 5 of Call the Midwife, a woman discovers that she has AIS. She attends a cervical smear and brings up that she has never had a period, and is concerned about having children as she is about to be married. She is then diagnosed with "testicular feminisation syndrome", the old term for AIS.

=== People with AIS ===
- Kitty Anderson (activist)
- Eden Atwood
- Bonnie Hart
- Phoebe Hart
- Maria José Martínez-Patiño
- Hanne Gaby Odiele
- Santhi Soundarajan
- Miriam van der Have
- Kimberly Zieselman

==== People with complete androgen insensitivity syndrome ====
- Georgiann Davis
- Seven Graham
- Alicia Roth Weigel

==== People with partial androgen insensitivity syndrome ====
- Tony Briffa
- Favorinus of Arelate has been described as having partial androgen insensitivity syndrome.
- Small Luk
- Eliana Rubashkyn
- Sean Saifa Wall
- Sogto Ochirov

== See also ==
- Estrogen insensitivity syndrome
- Spinal and bulbar muscular atrophy
- Congenital adrenal hyperplasia
- 5α-Reductase 2 deficiency
- Intersex Peer Support Australia (former Androgen Insensitivity Syndrome Support Group Australia)
