= List of researchers on intersex issues =

Intersex people are born with sex characteristics, such as genitals, gonads and chromosome patterns, "that do not fit typical binary notions of male or female bodies".

This list consists of notable researchers on intersex issues, including human rights, legal recognition and medical issues. The individual listings note the subject's main occupation or source of notability.

== Noted researchers on intersex ==
=== B ===
- Janik Bastien-Charlebois, Quebecois professor of sociology and advocate on intersex human rights.

=== C ===
- Morgan Carpenter, an Australian activist, researcher and bioethics graduate.
- Cary Gabriel Costello, U.S. associate professor of sociology and advocate for transgender and intersex rights.

=== D ===
- Georgiann Davis, U.S. associate professor of sociology and researcher on intersex issues.
- Milton Diamond, U.S. professor of neurology, University of Hawai'i at Manoa, and director of The Pacific Center for Sex and Society located at the University of Hawaii.
- Alice Dreger, U.S bioethicist, author and former chair of the Intersex Society of North America.

=== F ===
- Anne Fausto-Sterling, U.S. Professor Emerita and author of numerous books on intersex, including Sexing the Body: Gender Politics and the Construction of Sexuality, 2000.

=== G ===
- Richard Goldschmidt (1878–1958), U.S. geneticist who coined the word intersex.

=== H ===
- Morgan Holmes, Canadian sociology professor, author of books including Intersex: A Perilous Difference (2007), and editor of Critical Intersex, 2009.
- Ieuan Hughes, paediatric endocrinologist and a emeritus professor of paediatrics at the University of Cambridge.

=== K ===
- Katrina Karkazis, U.S. bioethicist, author of Fixing Sex: Intersex, Medical Authority, and Lived Experience, a 2008 book on intersex that is regarded as meticulous, authoritative and thoughtful.
- Suzanne Kessler, U.S. social psychologist and author of Lessons from the Intersexed, which inspired creation of the Phall-O-Meter phallus measurement tool.

=== M ===
- Heino Meyer-Bahlburg, U.S. psychologist best known for his work on biology of sexual orientation, gender identity, intersexuality, and HIV.
- John Money (1921–2006), New Zealand psychologist, sexologist and author, controversial due to the David Reimer case.
- Iain Morland, British author on gender, sexuality, medical ethics and science.

=== N ===
- Maria New, U.S. pediatrician and geneticist.

== See also ==
- Intersex
- List of intersex people
