= Quim =

Quim may refer to:

- Quim (footballer, born 1959), or Joaquim Carvalho de Azevedo, retired Portuguese footballer
- Quim (footballer, born 1967), or Joaquim Manuel Aguiar Serafim, Portuguese football coach and former player
- Quim (footballer, born 1975), or Joaquim Manuel Sampaio da Silva, Portuguese footballer
- Quim (magazine), lesbian erotica magazine published in the UK between 1989 and 2001
- Quim Torra (born 1962), Spanish politician
- Dated British slang for vulva
