= Gina Wilson =

Intersex activist

- Born: 1952 (age 73–74); Victoria, Australia
- Occupation: Community activist
- Known for: Intersex activist, founder of Intersex Human Rights Australia
- Website: ihra.org.au

Gina Wilson is an Australian intersex human rights activist. She was the founding president of Intersex Human Rights Australia (formerly known as OII Australia).

== Early life ==
Wilson was born in Victoria, Australia in 1952.

== Activism ==
Gina Wilson founded Intersex Human Rights Australia in 2009 and remained as president of the organisation until stepping down on 1 September 2013. She was succeeded by Morgan Carpenter and has since returned as vice-president. She has also been a member of the board of the National LGBTI Health Alliance a board associate of the AIDS Council of New South Wales, and Lidcombe, New South Wales branch president of the Australian Labor Party.

In her work at Intersex Human Rights Australia, Gina Wilson played an important role in improving access to healthcare, inclusion of intersex people in anti-discrimination legislation, and in aged care.

=== Anti-discrimination legislation ===
Wilson has played a leading role in moves to protect people on the basis of "intersex status" in anti-discrimination law, appearing before a Senate inquiry. Interviewed by the Sydney Morning Herald, Wilson spoke about how initial proposals for intersex inclusion in federal legislation were inappropriate as they classed intersex as a gender identity.

A Senate of Australia inquiry into anti-discriminination legislation supported the approach of the organisation and "intersex status" was added to the Sex Discrimination Amendment (Sexual Orientation, Gender Identity and Intersex Status) Act 2013, which passed into law on 1 August 2013.

=== Bodily autonomy ===
Wilson has called for "normalising" surgeries on intersex infants to end, saying that such interventions should only take place when a child is able to provide informed consent. In comments on Intersex Awareness Day 2012, Wilson said, "At a fundamental level homophobic bigotry, intolerance and ancient superstitions underpin contemporary mistreatment of intersex people. Intersex people are subjected to forced gendering and surgical alterations to our bodies to "disappear" our differences in a society that regards difference in sex anatomy as deeply suspicious."

Interviewed by Andrew Bock in The Age, Wilson expressed concern about the use of prenatal screening to terminate intersex foetuses.

=== Mental health and access to healthcare ===
Wilson played a role in efforts to improve access to Medicare services in 2013. The organisation has also called for the removal of intersex people from definitions of gender identity disorder in the American Psychiatric Association's diagnostic manual, saying "The assumption is that the birth assignment must be right. The doctor is never at fault, it's the poor intersex person who is wrong, who then gets carted off to a psychiatrist to try and 'fix' us."

=== Concern over identification documents and third gender ===
While welcoming federal guidelines on recognition of gender, Wilson has expressed concern about misrepresentation of intersex issues by some trans groups including the instrumentalisation of intersex in moves to create a third gender category, warning of "far-reaching unintended consequences".

== Selected bibliography ==
Selected published work includes:

- "Testimony of an Intersex Person" in the Equal Rights Trust journal Equal Rights Review.
- Wilson, Gina (25 October 2011). "The 14 days of intersex". Star Observer.
- Appearance in the 2012 documentary Intersexion.
- Appearance in a national campaign by Beyond Blue, titled Stop, Think, Respect, in the same year.
- A TEDx Sydney talk in 2010.

== Recognition ==
Gina Wilson was a finalist for the Australian Human Rights Commission Community Individual Award, 2013. The Commission describes the award as one of "the two most vigorously contested categories for the 2013 Australian Human Rights Awards" commenting that her "intersex advocacy work has been ground-breaking, helping to achieve authentic and appropriate inclusion in anti-discrimination legislation." Wilson was also nominated for a Community Hero "Honour Award" in 2011.
