= Bonnie Hart =

Intersex activist

- Born: Queensland, Australia
- Known for: Intersex human rights activist and president of Intersex Peer Support Australia
- Website: www.aissga.org.au

Bonnie Hart is an Australian artist, film maker, and intersex human rights activist, born with androgen insensitivity syndrome and president of Intersex Peer Support Australia. Hart performs nationally and internationally, and speaks on intersex issues nationally and internationally. In 2016, Australia's Gay News Network included her in their "25 LGBTI people to watch in 2017".

== Early life ==
Hart describes how she was told she experienced "heteronormative sexual training from a really early age", through multiple intersex medical interventions. Despite giving consent as a child, she felt unaware of the lifelong implications. Hart describes how stigma "sets the scene" for such interventions, "There’s a fear that people will be maladjusted because their bodies are different, and that fear teamed with the ignorance of the realities of what it’s like to live as an adult with those bodies without surgery, kind of perpetuates a surgical intervention process". Growing up, Hart did not know that her sister, Phoebe Hart, also had androgen insensitivity syndrome.

== Career ==
Hart is a "high-energy avant-garde performer" and multidisciplinary artist, assembling digital and analog filmmaking, music, and visual art. She is a cofounder of Venting Gallery and the Foundation for Contemporary Music and Culture in Brisbane, Queensland, and performs with bands including X-wave and the Unaustralians. In the autobiographical documentary Orchids, My Intersex Adventure, Hart and her sister face the traumatic emotional scars from early operations and the secrecy associated with them.

== Activism ==
Hart is president of Intersex Peer Support Australia. She has appeared in numerous short videos, including for QLife and the National LGBTI Health Alliance, and SBS. and is widely interviewed, including on national television.

== Selected bibliography ==
- Jones, Tiffany; Hart, Bonnie; Carpenter, Morgan; Ansara, Gavi; Leonard, William; Lucke, Jayne (2016). Intersex: Stories and Statistics from Australia (PDF). Cambridge, UK: Open Book Publishers. ISBN 978-1-78374-208-0. Archived from the original (PDF) on 14 September 2016.

== Recognition ==
In 2016, Australia's Gay News Network included Hart in their "LGBTI people to watch in 2017".
