= Alex Jürgen =

Intersex activist

- Born: September 7, 1976 (age 49); Steyr
- Occupation: Intersex activist
- Known for: First person in Austria to receive a birth certificate and passport with legal recognition of non-binary gender

Alex Jürgen (born September 7, 1976) is an Austrian intersex activist. Jürgen was the first person in Austria to receive a birth certificate and passport with legal recognition of non-binary gender after having fought for it in court.

== Life ==
Alex Jürgen was born intersex in a hospital in Steyr and was assigned male at birth by the doctors. Their parents gave them the name Jürgen. Two years later, doctors advised their parents to socialize them as a girl from then on because of an underdevelopment of their male sex characteristics. Their first name was changed to Alexandra, through a medical intervention their penis and their inner testicles were removed.

Elisabeth Scharang shot a documentary film about them and their fight for recognition of intersex people in Austria. The film was released in 2006 as Tintenfischalarm and had its premiere at the Berlin International Film Festival. Alex Jürgen was one of the first people in Austria to openly talk about being intersex and advocate for intersex rights.

In 2014, Jürgen founded the intersex rights organisation Verein intergeschlechtlicher Menschen Österreich (VIMÖ) and was an active member until 2018. Since then, they are an honorary member.

From 2016 on, together with the lawyer Helmut Graupner from the human rights organisation Rechtskomitee Lambda, they issued a complaint at the Constitutional Court in order to get a non-binary sex entry in their passport and birth certificate. In June 2018, the Constitutional Court confirmed that a third option needs to be introduced, referring to article 8 of the European Convention on Human Rights.
