= Intersex Peer Support Australia =

Australian charitable organisation

- Abbreviation: IPSA
- Formation: 1985
- Type: NGO
- Purpose: Intersex peer and family support program
- Region served: Australia
- Website: isupport.org.au

Intersex Peer Support Australia (IPSA), also known as the Androgen Insensitivity Syndrome Support Group Australia, is possibly the oldest known intersex organization, established in 1985. It provides peer and family support, information and advocacy. The group is run by volunteers, for people with intersex variations such as androgen insensitivity syndrome. It changed name from the Androgen Insensitivity Syndrome Support Group Australia (AISSGA) to Intersex Peer Support Australia in 2019. In 2024 it merged into Intersex Human Rights Australia to form InterAction for Health and Human Rights (InterAction). It is now a program of InterAction.

== History ==
IPSA may be the oldest intersex organization, established in 1985, prior to the Androgen Insensitivity Syndrome Support Group (UK), established in 1988, and the Intersex Society of North America (ISNA) in 1993.

IPSA was founded by Dr Garry Warne, then the Director of Paediatric Endocrinology at the Royal Children's Hospital, Melbourne. It is now run by a board of people with intersex variations, and parents. Notable members include Bonnie Hart, Phoebe Hart and Tony Briffa. Many members of the group took part in Phoebe Hart's 2010 autobiographical road movie, Orchids, My Intersex Adventure.

The organisation changed name in 2019, and merged into Intersex Human Rights Australia to form InterAction for Health and Human Rights (InterAction) in 2024. It is now a program of InterAction.

== Activities ==
=== Peer support ===
The core activity of the Group is to provide peer and family support, information and advocacy. It produces regular newsletters, known as dAISy, an annual conference, and regular meetings in Brisbane, Melbourne and Sydney.

=== Physical integrity and bodily autonomy ===
The group has advocated on intersex human rights issues since at least the turn of the century, with submissions on discrimination and prenatal terminations dating back to 2003. Tony Briffa was published in Nature in April 2004, calling for an end to irreversible sex assignment treatments in infancy. The group has also made a similar submission to a 2013 Australian Senate inquiry on involuntary or coerced sterilisation of people with disabilities.

In March 2017, representatives of IPSA participated in an Australian and Aotearoa/New Zealand consensus "Darlington Statement" by intersex community organizations and others. The statement calls for legal reform, including the criminalization of deferrable intersex medical interventions on children, an end to legal classification of sex, and improved access to peer support.

=== Education and awareness ===
Andie Hider, then president of IPSA, took part in the ABC television program Four Corners in July 2005. Current president Bonnie Hart appeared on Australian television with Intersex Human Rights Australia president Morgan Carpenter in March 2015, and in a short video for the National LGBTI Health Alliance QLife project, later that year.

== Affiliations ==
IPSA is a member of LGBTIQ+ Health Australia.

== See also ==
- Androgen insensitivity syndrome
- Intersex human rights
- Intersex rights in Australia
