= Lisa Downing =

British author and academic (born 1974)

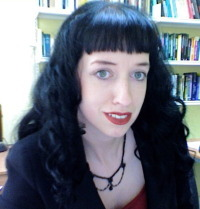
Lisa Downing

Lisa Downing (/ˈdaʊnɪŋ/; born 1974) is an author and academic. She is Professor of French Discourses of Sexuality at the University of Birmingham.

Downing's work is innovative in its dialogue between the critical humanities and the sciences, especially psychiatry. Her published work has focused on theories of sexual perversion and queer theory; the work of Michel Foucault; ethical philosophy and film; the cultural meanings of criminality; gendered selfishness; and, most recently, a critique of the culture of emotion or the "affective turn".

== Background and career ==
Downing trained in Modern European Languages, Literatures, and Thought at the Universities of London and Oxford. She took up a Lectureship at Queen Mary, University of London in 1999, where she was promoted to Reader in 2005. She was appointed to a chair at the University of Exeter in 2006, at the age of 31. In 2012, Downing moved to an established chair at the University of Birmingham.

She was one of co-organisers of the interdisciplinary seminar series "Critical Sexology" from 2006-2018.

== Awards ==
Downing received a 2009 Philip Leverhulme Prize, a prize "awarded to outstanding scholars under the age of 36 who have made a substantial contribution to their field of study, are recognised at an international level, and whose future contributions are held to be of correspondingly high promise."

== Works ==
Books as author

- Desiring the Dead: Necrophilia and Nineteenth-Century French Literature (Oxford, EHRC, 2003)
- Patrice Leconte (French Film Directors Series; Manchester University Press, 2004)
- The Cambridge Introduction to Michel Foucault (Cambridge University Press, 2008)
- Film and Ethics: Foreclosed Encounters (co-authored with Libby Saxton; Routledge, 2009)
- The Subject of Murder: Gender, Exceptionality, and the Modern Killer (Chicago University Press, 2013)
- Fuckology (Chicago University Press, 2014) co-authored with Iain Morland and Nikki Sullivan, a critical analysis of the legacy of psychologist and sexologist John Money. New Scientist described the book as "ably capturing" Money's story while Susan Stryker described the book as a "careful, critical and nuanced" analysis of Money's career.
- Selfish Women (Routledge, 2019). Emma Wilson described the book as "startling, trenchant and original" and stated that "Downing's critical brilliance, command of the material, and uncompromsing approach are dazzling".
- Against Affect (University of Nebraska Press, forthcoming 2026)

Books as editor

- Currencies: Fiscal Fortunes and Cultural Capital in Nineteenth-Century France (with Sarah Capitanio, Paul Rowe and Nick White; Peter Lang, 2005)
- Perversion: Psychoanalytic Perspectives/ Perspectives on Psychoanalysis (with Dany Nobus; Karnac Books, 2006)
- Birth and Death in Nineteenth-Century French Culture (with Nigel Harkness, Sonya Stephens and Tim Unwin; Rodopi, 2007)
- From Perversion to Purity: The Stardom of Catherine Deneuve (with Sue Harris; Manchester University Press, 2007)
- Queer in Europe: Contemporary Case Studies (with Robert Gillett; Ashgate, 2011)
- Queering the Second Wave (with Lara Cox; Edinburgh University Press, 2018)
- After Foucault: Culture, Criticism and Theory in the 21st Century (Cambridge University Press, 2018)
- Critical Freedoms (Edinburgh University Press, 2023)
