= Del LaGrace Volcano =

Artist and activist

- Born: July 26, 1957 (age 69); California, United States
- Occupations: Photographer, activist
- Website: dellagracevolcano.se

Del LaGrace Volcano (born July 26, 1957) is an American artist, performer, and activist from California. A formally trained photographer, Volcano's work includes installation, performance and film and interrogates the performance of gender on several levels, especially the performance of masculinity and femininity.

== Identity ==
Born intersex, Volcano developed both male and female characteristics as an adolescent but was raised and socialized as female. Volcano continued to live the first 37 years of their life as a woman, but since then has been living as both male and female. Del LaGrace Volcano (formerly named Della Grace) continues to adopt their true self through their name and gender. After marrying a queer man, Johnny Volcano, Del took on their current name to challenge the "bi-gendered status quo." Johnny has now changed his name while Del kept the surname and passed it on to their two children. Del has been in a partnership with the children's mother, Matilda Wurm since 2006, to which Del refers to themself as a "MaPa".

== Education ==
Prior to moving to San Francisco when they were nineteen, Volcano attended Allan Hancock College as a student in the Visual Studies program from 1977 to 1979. Volcano earned an MA in Photographic Studies at University of Derby, UK in 1992 after studying photography at the San Francisco Art Institute from 1979 to 1981.

== Life and career ==
Volcano's work complicates understandings of both femininity and masculinity by depicting lesbian masculinity. In "The Feminine Principle," Volcano takes queer femininities as a focus; included in this project is a portrait of Kate Bornstein. In "Lesbian Boyz and Other Inverts," Volcano celebrates butch dykes, transsexual boys and other gender-queers. In the project, masculinity is shown as a tool of subversion.

Volcano's recent photographs demonstrate how intersex bodies can offer an entirely new perspective on the body. The “normal” body in relation to Volcano's photographs becomes queer, describing the bodies in their latest works as "sites of mutation, loss, and longing." In these newer works, Volcano takes on the loss of their friend Kathy Acker and the transformation of their lover Simo Maronati's abled body into a disabled one. Here, Volcano illustrates the queerness of any body that is marked by illness or trauma. Their self-portrait "INTER*me" photograph series (formally the "Herm Body" series) is a raw rendition of the artist's body using black and white Polaroid film. In conversation with their previous work, it speaks to the construction of different age-selves and the technologies of gender in photography.

Volcano's artist statement of September 2005 reads:

As a gender variant visual artist I access 'technologies of gender' in order to amplify rather than erase the hermaphroditic traces of my body. I name myself. A gender abolitionist. A part time gender terrorist and an intentional mutation My journey must be distinguished from the thousands of intersex individuals who have had their 'ambiguous' bodies mutilated and disfigured in a misguided attempt at "normalization". I believe in crossing the line, not just once, but as many times as it takes to build a bridge we can all walk across.

Volcano also explores themes of sexual and gender fluidity throughout their work. Volcano often depicts the instability of gender identity by pushing past the binary gender system, and frequently uses their own queerness in their work to contest the idea of sexual identity as something that is permanently embodied. As shown in Volcano's photography book "Love Bites," Volcano presents various images of women engaged in sexual play, dressed "in costumes ranging from brides to gay leather men." Volcano, in this way, seems to aim at defying conventional gender norms and feminist principles within their text. In Teddy Boy David, Volcano further pushes this agenda and toys with the idea of age dynamics and specifically youthfulness in terms of sexuality and sexual play.

== Publications ==
=== Publications by Volcano ===
Love Bites, as Della Grace, published by Gay Men's Press, London, 1991: "In the USA it was banned by Customs & Excise for two weeks. In Canada they cut the most "offensive" photographs out of the book before selling it. In England it was sold by mainstream booksellers but not in lesbian or gay bookshops who protested they couldn't take the risk or disagreed with the SM content." Specifically, Silver Moon women's bookshop in London supported the work, but were concerned about being prosecuted, whilst Sisterwrite refused to sell the book because of its SM content.

The Drag King Book, co-authored with Judith "Jack" Halberstam, published by Serpent's Tail, 1999. The Drag King Book focusses on the drag kings of London, San Francisco, and New York. Volcano, in the book's foreword, describes their first experience with a drag king act, which took place in San Francisco in 1985 when "the On Our Backs/ BurLEZK gang were putting on strip shows for lesbians at The Baybrick Inn."

Sublime Mutations, published by Konkursbuch, 2000: "Sublime Mutations, a photographic retrospective of Del LaGrace Volcano's work produced over the course of the last ten years, visually remaps the political and theoretical cutting edge of the queer avant garde." In Jay Prossler's introduction, Prossler claims that through LaGrace Volcano's work "we see the changing shape of our bodies and our communities reflected". Importantly however, we also glimpse the changes promised by our was of seeing, the mutations we read as well as those that are visited upon our bodies. LaGrace Volcano skillfully demonstrates that sublime mutations are always already the transformations that viewers project on the physical world, and especially on the body.

Sex Works 1978–2005, also containing an essay by Paul Preciado. Published by Konkursbuch, 2005. Sex Works shows a history of sex in the queer scene.

=== Publications with contributions by Volcano ===
A contribution to Queer Theory, edited by Iain Morland and Dino Willox, published in 2004. The book presents fifteen articles on sexuality, gender studies and other aspects of queer studies. Other contributors include Judith Butler, Patrick Califia, Cheryl Chase, Larry Kramer, and Stephen Whittle.

A contribution to Inter: Erfahrungen intergeschlechtlicher Menschen in der Welt der zwei Geschlechter, edited by Elisa Barth, in 2013. Other contributors include Mauro Cabral, Sally Gross, and Phoebe Hart.

Femmes of Power : Exploding Queer Feminities, co-authored with Ulrika Dahl. Published by Serpent's Tail in 2008

A contribution to Intersex and After, an issue of GLQ: A Journal of Lesbian and Gay Studies edited by Iain Morland in 2009. Other contributors include Alice Dreger, Iain Morland, and Vernon Rosario.

Volcano's photography featured in the sex-positive lesbian erotica publication Quim magazine, published in the UK between 1989 and 2001.

== Exhibitions ==
=== Solo exhibitions ===
- Reterospective: Del LaGrace, Magazin 4, Bregenz, Austria, September 1996
- A Kingdome Comes, Standpoint Gallery, London, July 1999
- Fluid Fire, Galleri Format, Malmö, Sweden, December 2001
- One Man? Show, Babele Gallery, Milan, Italy, April 2001
- Gerkhe's Artists, Hamburg Erotic Art Museum, 2001
- Fluid Fire, Format Gallery, Malmo, 2002
- Venus Boyz, Zita, Folkets Bio, Stockholm, Sweden, May 2002
- Pas de Regrets, â la Galerie du Forum des images, France, November 2003
- Intersex 101: The Two Gender System as a Human Rights Abuse, NGBK gallery, Berlin, Germany, June 2005
- Corpus Queer: bodies in resistance, Transpalette, Emmetrop, Bourges, France September 2005
- Mid-career retrospective, Leslie Lohman Museum, 2012

=== Group exhibitions ===
- Street Style, Victoria & Albert Museum, London, June, 1994
- Desire, Nordic Arts Centre, Helsinki, Finland; Kulturhuset, Stockholm, Sweden; Louisiana, Humlebœk, Denmark; 1995–97
- Duke: King of the Hill, Courtauld Galleries, London, November 1999 – 2001
- Encounters of the Third Kind, Melkweg, Amsterdam, Netherlands, August 1998
- Sex Mutant, The Nunnery, London, August 2000
- Fallen Heroes: Masculinity & Representation, Espai D'Art Contemporani de Castello, CastÉleon, Spain, April 2002
- Female Turbulence, Aeroplastics Gallery, Brussels, Belgium, October 2003
- A Boost in the Shell, Aeroplastics Gallery Brussels, Belgium, May 2005
- Women in Revolt! Art and Activism in the UK 1970–1990, Tate Britain, November 2023 – April 2024

== Television and film work ==
Volcano appeared in Gabriel Baur's film, Venus Boyz.
