= InterAction for Health and Human Rights =

Intersex organization in Australia

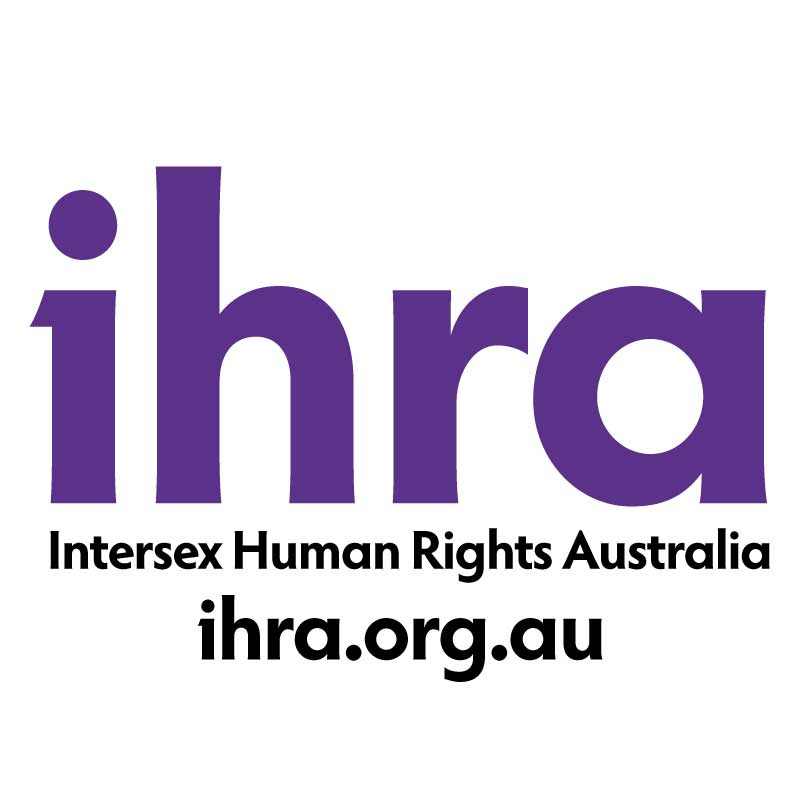
- Abbreviation: InterAction
- Formation: 2009
- Type: NGO
- Purpose: Intersex human rights, psychosocial and peer support, education and training
- Region served: Australia
- Executive director: Morgan Carpenter
- Website: interaction.org.au

InterAction for Health and Human Rights (InterAction or (InterAction DownUnder) is a voluntary organisation for intersex people that promotes the human rights and bodily autonomy of intersex people in Australia, delivers psychosocial and peer support, and provides education and information services. Established in 2009 and incorporated as a charitable company in 2010, it was formerly known as Intersex Human Rights Australia and Organisation Intersex International Australia, or OII Australia, and changed its name with the merger into it of Intersex Peer Support Australia. It is recognised as a Public Benevolent Institution.

== History ==
The institution was founded in 2009 and established as a company in 2010. Founding president Gina Wilson stepped down on 1 September 2013.

The current executive director is Morgan Carpenter, previously co-executive director and president. Bonnie Hart is Deputy Executive Director and InterLink service manager. Tony Briffa, known as the first publicly intersex mayor, previously served as co-executive director.

== Activities ==
=== Physical integrity and bodily autonomy ===
Intersex Human Rights Australia campaigns in favour of personal autonomy in medical interventions affecting intersex people, including an end to cosmetic or "normalising" surgeries on intersex infants. In late 2012, the Senate's Community Affairs References Committee established an inquiry into the involuntary or coerced sterilisation of people with disabilities. In February 2013, intersex was added as an additional term of reference. The Committee published a joint, cross-party report on 25 October 2013, making 15 recommendations. The conclusions of the inquiry supported much of the case and recommendations made by InterAction:

3.109 ... As OII commented, normalisation surgery is more than physical reconstruction. The surgery is intended to deconstruct an intersex physiology and, in turn, construct an identity that conforms with stereotypical male and female gender categories... 3.129 ... The proposals put forward by Organisation Intersex International have merit, and are consistent with the committee's conclusions. The committee believes that a protocol covering 'normalising' surgery should be developed, and then adhered to in all cases of intersex children. Such a guideline should be consistent with Organisational Intersex International's recommendations

In May 2019, InterAction published a multilingual joint statement signed by more than 50 intersex-led organizations condemning the introduction of "disorders of sex development" language into the International Classification of Diseases, stating that this causes "harm" and facilitates human rights violations, calling on the World Health Organization to publish clear policy to ensure that intersex medical interventions are "fully compatible with human rights norms".

The institution also engages directly with clinicians and biologists. While opposing use of terminology that it describes as pathologising, such as "Disorders of Sex Development", Carpenter is nevertheless named as a reviewer for a "DSD Genetics" website funded by the National Health and Medical Research Council Australia.

In a submission to the UN Committee Against Torture in 2016, the organisation submitted that Australian governments recognise the dignity and rights of LGBTI people, but at the same time, "harmful practices" on intersex children continue.

In March 2017, representatives of InterAction's founding organizations participated in an Australian and Aotearoa/New Zealand consensus "Darlington Statement" by intersex community organisations and others. The statement calls for legal reform, including the criminalization of deferrable intersex medical interventions on children, an end to legal classification of sex, and improved access to peer support.

InterAction played a key role in the passage of legislation to protect the bodily autonomy of children with intersex variations in the Australian Capital Territory.

=== Psychosocial and peer support ===
InterAction delivers psychosocial and peer support services through the InterLink and Intersex Peer Support Australia programs.

=== Access to healthcare ===
In July 2013, the Commonwealth announced that it was removing sex or gender terms from item codes for Medicare procedures, following input from InterAction. InterAction noted that the changes do not ensure full access to the Pharmaceutical Benefits Scheme (PBS).

=== Protection from discrimination ===
In late 2012, the Australian Government's proposed Human Rights and Anti-Discrimination Bill included intersex as a "gender identity". This was criticised by InterAction on the basis that intersex people needed protection, but biological differences should not come within the definition. Writing in the Equal Rights Trust journal Equal Rights Review, Gina Wilson wrote, "Legislators initially did not have a clear understanding of what intersex was, but having given evidence to Senate Committees and spoken with legislators individually we are hopeful that intersex will be a protected attribute under the Bill."

On 25 June 2013, the Sex Discrimination Amendment (Sexual Orientation, Gender Identity and Intersex Status) Act passed with cross-party support, and became law on 1 August 2013. This was the first time "intersex status" had been a protected attribute under Australian discrimination legislation.

=== Identification documents ===
The organisation has stated that "while sex or gender markers are still required", it supports binary, non-binary and multiple gender classifications for adults, but only binary classifications for infants and children, fearing stigmatisation and the potential impact on sex assignment processes for infants. The organisation cautiously acknowledged an Australian Capital Territory Bill to modify the Territory's birth registrations process to create a third sex category for infants and children, stating, "neither of the two national intersex organisations had been engaged in talks before the bill was presented in the Assembly." In 2017, the organisation reported that no children had been assigned to such a category, viewing this as a vindication of the argument that such classifications exacerbate parental fears.

In March 2017, an Australian and Aotearoa/New Zealand community statement called for an end to legal classification of sex, stating that legal third classifications, like binary classifications, were based on structural violence and failed to respect diversity and a "right to self-determination".

=== Marriage ===
Citing cases where marriages have been annulled, and where marriage prospects are stated as a rationale for early medical interventions, InterAction's founding organizations campaigned for marriage rights regardless of sex characteristics. The institution expressed concern at the marriage implications of constructions of intersex as a third sex. In 2017 the Marriage Amendment (Definition and Religious Freedoms) Bill 2017 specifically refers to '2 people' rather than 'same-sex' with respect to the definition of marriage.

=== International work ===
InterAction for Health and Human Rights and its founding organizations are represented at numerous international events, including the "first United Nations Human Rights Council side event on intersex issues" in March 2014, alongside Mauro Cabral and representatives of Intersex UK and Zwischengeschlecht.

=== Intersex flag ===
Intersex flag

The Intersex flag was created in July 2013 by Morgan Carpenter of InterAction for Health and Human Rights (then known as Organisation Intersex International Australia) to be a flag "that is not derivative, but is yet firmly grounded in meaning". The circle is described as "unbroken and unornamented, symbolising wholeness and completeness, and our potentialities. We are still fighting for bodily autonomy and genital integrity, and this symbolises the right to be who and how we want to be."

== Awards and recognition ==
Co-chair Tony Briffa was recognized for her instrumental role in the passing of legislative protections for intersex people in medical settings in debates in the State of Victoria in February 2026.

In a speech introducing legal protections for intersex people in medical settings in the Australian Capital Territory, Chief Minister Andrew Barr recognized Executive Director Morgan Carpenter for his "tireless work". In a later debate, Carpenter and his team including Steph Lum, Cody Smith, Bonnie Hart, Mimi Hall and Gabriel Filpi were recognized for their "diligent, passionate and highly intellectual work".

The organisation was nominated for a 2013 Community Organisation "Honour" Award for its work on anti-discrimination legislation. Founding former president Gina Wilson was a finalist for the Australian Human Rights Commission Community Individual Award in 2013, following her retirement, for her work on discrimination protections.

== Affiliations ==
InterAction for Health and Human Rights is a national affiliate of Organisation Intersex International, a member of the National LGBTI Health Alliance and the International Lesbian, Gay, Bisexual, Trans and Intersex Association.

== See also ==
- Intersex human rights
- Intersex rights in Australia
- Organisation Intersex International
