= Esteban de Valdaracete =

15th and 16th century Spanish fencing teacher

- Born: Estebanía; 1496; Valdaracete, Madrid
- Occupation: Fencing teacher

Esteban de Valdaracete, born Estebanía (Valdaracete, 1496) and assigned a woman at birth, was a Spanish intersex person who lived in the 15th and 16th centuries.

== Biography ==
Esteban was born in 1496 in the province of Valdaracete, in Madrid. He was assigned female at birth and received the name of Estebanía.

From an early age, Esteban stood out for his strength and speed, and practiced traditionally male activities.

After leaving his province he settled in Granada, and achieved so much fame for his supposed heroic actions that he was summoned by the authorities of the city's Chancellery, since they did not believe it possible for a woman to perform such feats. There he was examined by several midwives, who declared him to be a hermaphrodite and ordered him to choose a sex under which to live the rest of his life. Esteban chose to live as a man, adopting his new name and identity.

As a man he married a woman, and began working as a fencing teacher. He gained even greater recognition when, after a visit by Emperor Charles V to the city, he defeated his best officers in combat.

Esteban died at a young age. At the funeral, both his mother and his wife mourned his death, with his mother referring to him as her "daughter" and his wife as "husband."
