= Intersexion =

- Directed by: Grant Lahood
- Produced by: John Keir
- Starring: Mani Mitchell; Tamara Beck; Cheryl Chase; Caitlin Petrakis Childs; Gavan Coleman; Jim Costich; Tiger Devore; Sally Gross; Esther Morris Leidolf; Stephanie Long; Jen Pagonis; Michel Reiter; David Cameron Strachan; Anne Tamar-Mattis; Suegee Tamar-Mattis; Hida Viloria; Gina Wilson
- Production company: Ponsonby Productions Limited
- Release date: 5 April 2012
- Running time: 68 minutes
- Country: New Zealand
- Language: English

Intersexion is a 2012 documentary about intersex people. The film was researched and presented by activist Mani Mitchell, New Zealand's first "out" intersex person. It was written, directed and edited by Grant Lahood and produced by John Keir.

== Synopsis ==
Mani Mitchell and Grant Lahood set out to "de-mystify" intersex, looking "beyond the shame and secrecy that defines many intersex births". Interviewing intersex people around the world, the film explores how they "navigate their way through childhood, adolescence, relationships and adulthood, when they don’t fit the binary model of a solely male and female world". The film follows Mitchell on a tour, visiting intersex people in America, Ireland, Germany, South Africa and Australia. Interviews with sex researchers are also included, as well as some history of the treatment of intersex conditions. Those who had early surgical interventions, per the theories of researchers such as John Money, contrast their experiences with those who grew up without these interventions.

== Cast ==
The cast of Intersexion includes intersex activists from around the world, including Mani Mitchell, Bo Laurent, also known as Cheryl Chase, Caitlin Petrakis Childs, Gavan Coleman, Jim Costich, Tiger Devore, Sally Gross, Esther Morris Leidolf, Stephanie Long, Pidgeon Pagonis (then known as Jen), Michel Reiter, David Cameron Strachan, Anne Tamar-Mattis, Suegee Tamar-Mattis, Peter Trinkl, Hida Viloria and Gina Wilson.

== Reception ==
Graham Adams, writing for New Zealand magazine Metro describes how, "while the frankness of his subjects can be arresting, Lahood's interest in them is never prurient, or patronising. And the documentary fairly skips along." Jennie Kermode, writing for Eye For Film, writes, "Intersexion is a vital film not only in bringing it to public view, but in doing so primarily through the stories of intersex people themselves".

== Awards ==
Intersexion won 'Best New Zealand Documentary' and 'Best Editing' at the Documentary Edge Festival in 2012. It was a runner up in the Derek Oyston Film Prize in the London BFI Lesbian and Gay Film Festival 2013, and recipient of the Audience Award for Best Documentary in the Hamburg International Queer Film Festival, 2012.

== See also ==
- Intersex human rights
