= SX News =

Australian LGBTQ newspaper

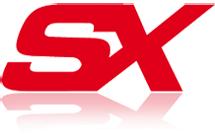
- SX#312 Masthead
- Type: Weekly newspaper
- Format: Glossy Tabloid
- Owner: Evo Media
- Editor: Reg Domingo
- News editor: Cec Busby
- Founded: January 2000
- Ceased publication: 2017
- Language: English
- Headquarters: 140 William Street, East Sydney, NSW, Australia
- Price: Free pickup,
- Website: SX News website

SX News was a weekly gay and lesbian newspaper based in Sydney, Australia.

One of several titles published by Evo Media under the Gay News Network banner. SX News (commonly referred to as SX) was distributed throughout Sydney and New South Wales.

== Features ==
The publication covered local, national and international news of interest to the gay and lesbian community, and had a strong focus on the arts and entertainment.

SX featured interviews with high-profile people of interest to the gay and lesbian community. Interviews over the years included Kylie Minogue, Scissor Sisters, The Hon. Michael Kirby, Louie Spence, Sydney Lord Mayor Clover Moore MP, NSW Premier Nathan Rees, Dr Brad McKay, Rupert Everett, Perez Hilton, Janet Jackson, k.d. lang, Liza Minnelli, Pam Ann, and the Pet Shop Boys.

== Editors ==
Previous SX editors included founding editor Martin de Courtenay, Reg Domingo, Peter Hackney and Brad Johnston. The publication drew on a stable of regular contributors, including political commentators Rodney Croome and Sam Butler, theatre critic Veronica Hannon, Gay media identity Trevor Ashley, Sydney drag identity Joyce Mange and gay Australian author C. S. Burrough, whose novel Not Grunting, Squealing was serialised in 23 weekly instalments between 25 January 2001 and 21 June 2001.

== History ==
In late 2006, the publication changed from a newsprint format to a high-quality, full-colour full-gloss format.

SX was the official media sponsor of the Sydney Gay and Lesbian Mardi Gras.

In July 2010, SX celebrated its 500th issue with a special retrospective edition.

In 2015, SX began an LGBTI Health and HIV online hub called Check Up.

In 2015, television doctor Dr Brad McKay began a regular column called "Ask Dr Brad" in SX magazine and on the CheckUp web portal.

In March 2017, after allegations of insolvent trading, non payment of creditors, including staff and the Australian Taxation Office, the group's main website http://www.gaynewsnetwork.com.au was taken offline by their hosting provider due to non payment. Since then no explanation has been provided to staff, suppliers or advertisers as to the status of the publications. As at 7 May 2017, all sites associated with EvoMedia remain offline with no sign as to when if ever they will come online again.
