= Quim (magazine) =

British magazine

- Winter 1991 cover
- Editor: Sophie Moorcock
- Editor: Lulu Belliveau
- Categories: lesbian, erotica
- First issue: 1989
- Final issue: 2001
- Country: United Kingdom
- Language: English

Quim: for dykes of all sexual persuasions was a British sex positive, lesbian magazine published between 1989 and 1994 with a further issue published in 2001. The magazine was edited by Sophie Moorcock and Lulu Belliveau, who had previously worked as a photo editor at On Our Backs, the first US magazine of women's erotica. Influences included Shocking Pink a young women's zine produced in London between 1979–1992 and Sheila McLaughlin's 1987 film She Must Be Seeing Things. The magazine had an irregular publication cycle that depended on when funding and content were available.

== Content and contributors ==
The editorial stance of Quim was anti-censorship and pro-sex, and there was little censorship of content, most of which was submitted by volunteer contributors. Quim featured articles, creative writing, art and photography covering topics including fantasies, orgasm, masturbation, safe sex, sex toys and sadomasochism. In 1991, "Quim Notebooks" were circulated in gay and lesbian bars and bookshops to encourage contributors to submit stories and ideas to the magazine.

The first edition included an interview with Susie Bright, editor of On Our Backs. Issue five was entitled 'Black Dykes Speak Out' and centred on the experiences of black lesbians. The sixth and final edition focused on the eviction of a lesbian house and hub for direct action at Bird in Bush Road. The magazine published fiction by authors including Pat Califia, Jane Solanas, Jo Fisk and Leonora Rogers Wright, and photography by Della Grace and Lola Flash.

== Reception and legacy ==
The first issue of the magazine received a hostile response, and it was two years before the second issue was published. Owing to the explicit and sadomasochistic nature of the content, a number of lesbian and gay bookshops, including Sisterwise and Gay's the Word, refused to carry the magazine. The magazine remained controversial and continued to receive unfavourable reviews in the gay press.

Quim was later credited, along with On Our Backs, with laying the foundations for later women's erotica including the Australian magazine Slit and Madonna's Sex book.
