= Fortunio Affaitati =

Italian physician and astrologer

Fortunio Affaitati (1510–1550) was an Italian physicist and astrologer.

He was born to the aristocratic Affaitati family in Cremona, and dedicated to Pope Paul III a series of essays titled Phisicae ac astronomicae considerationes (1549). He retired to live in England.
