= Phoebe Hart =

Australian filmmaker and intersex rights activist

- Born: Queensland, Australia
- Occupations: Filmmaker and lecturer
- Known for: Filmmaker
- Website: www.hartflicker.com

Phoebe Hart is an Australian filmmaker, lecturer and intersex rights activist, born with Androgen Insensitivity Syndrome. Hart lectures in film, television and digital media at the Queensland University of Technology, and is principal of Hartflicker, a video and film production company. She is known particularly for her autobiographical road trip movie, Orchids, My Intersex Adventure.

== Early life ==
Hart describes how she was told she would never menstruate nor have children, but the reasons were not discussed and the topic was taboo. When Hart was 17 years of age, her mother told her the family secret, that Hart had testes in her abdomen. Hart was pressured into a gonadectomy (sterilization), and in the documentary she faces the traumatic emotional scars from that operation and the secrecy associated with it. During the shooting of her auto-biography, her parents initially refused to be filmed.

== Career ==
Hart completed her film studies at the Queensland University of Technology (QUT) in 1995. She has been involved in the children's programme Totally Wild, Network Ten's documentary unit, and the Australian Broadcasting Corporation's Race Around the World and Fly TV.

In 2009, Hart was awarded her doctorate from QUT, of which Orchids was a central element of her doctoral studies. This documentary took six years for the principal documenters (sisters Phoebe and Bonnie Hart) to film, using a variety of cameras including semi-professional digital cameras, domestic VHS camcorders, and Super 8. She describes the work as a means of helping young intersex people to come to terms with their bodies:

One of the goals I had in telling my own story in a documentary and publically [sic] revealing me as intersex to a global audience was to change minds and show how our lives are not so unlike anyone else. In particular, I wanted to create a positive frame for young people with intersex variations, who I hoped would not have to go through what I experienced. I had to hide who I was from others, and was constantly terrified of being excluded for the monster and freak I had come to believe I was.

Hart is also a former president of the Androgen Insensitivity Syndrome Support Group Australia.

== Selected bibliography ==
=== Film ===
- Hart co-directed a documentary series called Downunder Grads on the condition of Australian higher education for the Special Broadcasting Service (SBS), screened in March 2008.
- Orchids, My Intersex Adventure is an auto-biographical 2010 documentary about one woman's struggle to understand her own intersex condition while interviewing other intersex people on a road trip of self-discovery around Australia. Director Phoebe Hart used digital cameras and a small crew including her sister, Bonnie Hart. The film won the ATOM Award for Best Documentary General.
- Hart also directed and co-wrote the Australian Broadcasting Corporation documentary Roller Derby Dolls about a group of women who play in roller derby. Roller Derby Dolls screened in a prime-time slot, 9 September 2008.

=== Peer-reviewed journals ===
- Hart, Phoebe (March 2013). "Orchids, intersex and the auto/biographical project". Studies in Documentary Film. 7 (1): 79–91. doi:10.1386/sdf.7.1.79_1. ISSN 1750-3280. S2CID 151625176.
- Hart, Phoebe (June 2016). "Writing characters with intersex variations for television". Journal of Screenwriting. 7 (2): 207–223. doi:10.1386/josc.7.2.207_1. ISSN 1759-7137. S2CID 192280795.

=== Books and book chapters ===
- "Making orchids – Gardening an intersex experience on videotape [In German - Orchideen Züchten. Eine inter Erfahrung auf Film]", a contribution to the book Inter: Erfahrungen intergeschlechtlicher Menschen in der Welt der zwei Geschlechter, edited by Elisa Barth, in 2013. Other notable contributors include Mauro Cabral, Sally Gross, and Del LaGrace Volcano.
- "All of Us", a resource for schools produced by the Safe Schools Coalition Australia. Hart appears in a video and in a teachers' Unit Guide.

=== Editorial works ===
- Hart, Phoebe (7 October 2015). "My intersex body: more than an object of fascination or repulsion to be 'fixed'". The Independent.
- Hart, Phoebe (October 2015), "Intersex and disclosure: Into the light", Archer Magazine

== Recognition ==
Hart has received multiple awards and academic honours for the documentary Orchids, My Intersex Adventure and also academic commendation for a related thesis entitled "Orchids: Intersex and Identity in Documentary". She is a Robson Fellow of the Ormond College, University of Melbourne.

== Personal life ==
Hart and her husband desired to start a family, and adopted a child. Hart's infertility and the stress of the adoption process strained their marriage.

== See also ==
- List of female film and television directors
- List of LGBT-related films directed by women
