= Santiago Mbanda Lima =

Artivist

- Born: May 18, 1989 (age 37); Viseu, Portugal
- Other name: Santiago D’Almeida Ferreira
- Occupation: Activist
- Known for: Intersex activism

Santiago Mbanda Lima, also known as Santiago D’Almeida Ferreira, born in Viseu, Portugal, on May 18, 1989, is an Angolan-Portuguese artivist. He is co-founder and co-director of the non-governmental organization Ação Pela Identidade (Action For Identity, API), of which he was the first president. He was the first intersex person to become publicly visible in Portugal, while also advocating for anti-racist and feminist causes. He is largely unknown in his own country, unlike other Portuguese LGBT+ or anti-racism activists.

== Early life ==
Born in the city of Viseu, Mbanda Lima worked there and in other cities in Portugal and Germany, before settling in Lisbon, where he established the association Action For Identity, in October 2015.

== Activism ==
Mbanda Lima has become known as a spokesperson for intersex rights, at national level in Portugal, and at international level. He first publicly disclose being intersex in a speech to the national Assembly of the Republic at a public hearing on May 5, 2015, initiating a legislative process for a law to protect people on grounds of sex characteristics. In April 2016, his profile was highlighted by the U.S. magazine The Advocate, and in January 2018 he was interviewed by Fátima Lopes for the talkshow A Tarde é Sua, broadcast by Televisão Independente.

On January 26, 2018, Mbanda Lima spoke to the Subcommittee on Equality and Non-discrimination, in the context of a parliamentary debate on proposed law 38/2018 of August 7, on the Right to self-determination of gender and protection of sex characteristics. In May 2018, Santiago was the only intersex person to participate in the government campaign Trans and Intersex: #DireitoASer, launched for International Day Against Homophobia, Transphobia and Biphobia during the 6th International IDAHOT Forum, which was held for the first time in Lisbon, Portugal. The event followed publication on April 13, 2018, of draft law 38/2018.

== Artivism ==
Mbanda Lima engages in artistic projects under the name Yagombanda. Since 2015, he has offered workshops on artivism. In 2016 he conceived, with Ação Pela Identidade, the campaign #AnoGisberta, to mark the 10th anniversary of the murder of Gisberta Salce, a Brazilian trans woman and sex worker who was murdered in Portugal in 2006.

In 2018, he returned to his hometown to inaugurate the House of Yagombanda, inspired by black, queer and afro cultures, performing in the 19th Theater Festival of Viseu on May 18, 2018, with the monologue Chronicle of Failure. On July 7 and 8, 2018, he performed in the Jardins Efémeros.

== See also ==
- Intersex human rights
