= Leopold Zahn =

Austrian author and art historian (1890–1970)

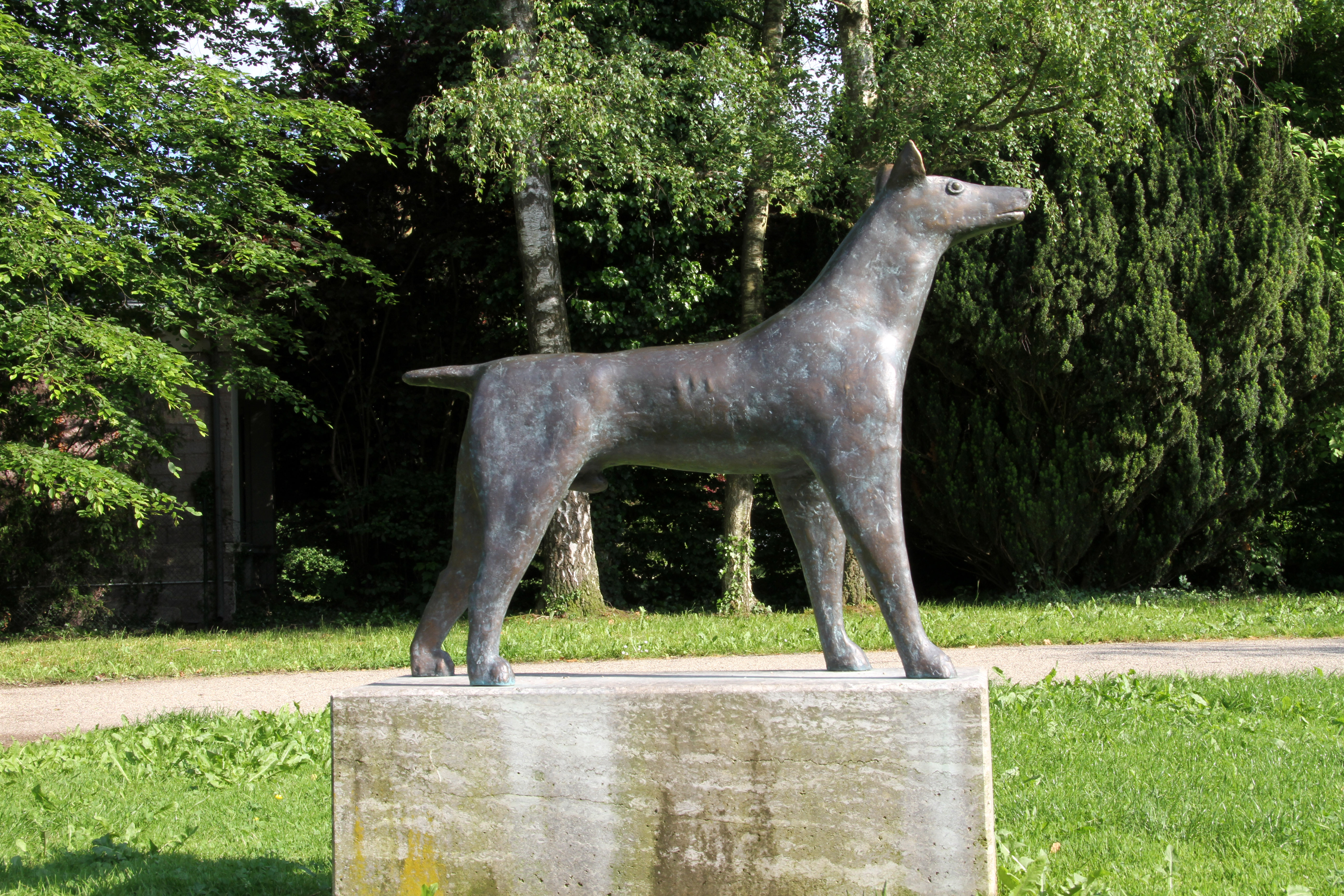
Memorial to Leopold Zahn in Baden-Baden

Leopold Zahn (1890–1970) was an Austrian writer and art historian who was an expert on the works of Paul Klee. He wrote an autobiographical account of his experience being brought up as a girl, due to an unspecified intersex condition. This was published anonymously in Vienna in 1910, entitled Aus dem Tagebuch einer männlichen Gymnasiastin (From the diary of a male schoolgirl).

== Early life ==
Zahn was born Leopoldine in 1890, in Salesianergasse in Vienna. At his birth, the midwife was unsure of his gender, and the child was raised as a girl. At age 17, he changed his name to Leopold, and the name and gender entry were corrected in the baptismal register. This alteration of the records featured in newspapers of the time. Zahn wrote an autobiographical account of his experience, which was published anonymously in Vienna in 1910, entitled Aus dem Tagebuch einer männlichen Gymnasiastin (From the diary of a male schoolgirl).

== Career ==
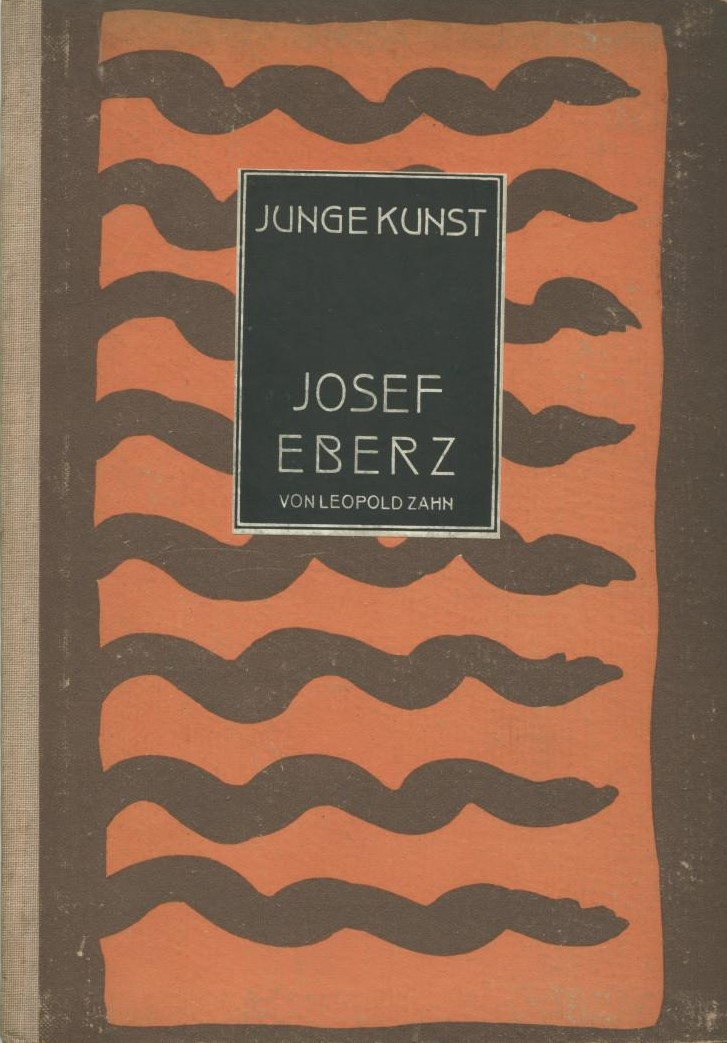
Leopold Zahn - Josef Eberz, 1920

Zahn was an art historian, critic and gallery owner. He published one of the first monographs on Paul Klee in 1920, and his work on Klee influenced later views on cosmology in Klee's work. Zahn also wrote on decorative arts, especially Viennese furniture.

In 1946, together with Woldemar Klein, he founded the magazine Das Kunstwerk, which developed into an important publication on modern art in West Germany. The first issue focussed on the role of the artist in society. In 1955 he was a co-founder of the Die Gesellschaft der Freunde junger Kunst (The Society of Friends of Young Art). He died in 1970.
