= Hermaphrodite (disambiguation) =

A hermaphrodite is a sexually reproducing organism that produces both male and female gametes.

Hermaphrodite may also refer to:

== Biology ==
- Hermaphrodite (botany), a flowering plant that has both male and female structures, that is, it combines both sexes in one structure
- Bovine hermaphrodite, an infertile cow with masculinized behavior and non-functioning ovaries
- Sequential hermaphrodite, an individual that changes its sex at some point in its life
- Simultaneous hermaphrodite, an individual that has sex organs of both sexes and can produce both gamete types even in the same breeding season
- Intersex (biology), a general term for an organism that has sex characteristics that are between male and female
  - Intersex person, an individual born with any of several sex characteristics, including chromosomes, gonads, sex hormones, or genitals that do not fit typical binary notions of male or female bodies
    - Hermaphrodite (slur)
    - Pseudohermaphrodite, an individual whose gonads are mismatched with their internal reproductive system and/or external genitalia
    - True hermaphrodite, an individual who is born with ovarian and testicular tissue

== Arts and entertainment ==
- Hermaphrodite (Nadar), an 1860 series of photographs by Nadar
- The Hermaphrodite, a 2004 novel by Julia Ward Howe

== Other uses ==
- Hermaphrodite brig, a type of sailing ship
- Hermaphrodite caliper, a type of caliper
- Hermaphroditic connector, a gender of connectors or fasteners

== See also ==
- Hermaphroditus, a Greek god
- Gender ambiguity
- Androgyny (disambiguation)
