= Iain Morland =

British music technologist and author (born 1978)

- Born: 1978 (age 47–48)
- Occupation: Music technologist
- Known for: Intersex author
- Website: www.iainmorland.net

Iain Morland (born 1978) is a British music technologist and author. He formerly lectured in cultural criticism at Cardiff University. His writings focus on issues of gender and sexuality, medical ethics, and science. In 2005, Times Higher Education described Morland as a leading academic in the field of sex research. He has edited an edition of the journal GLQ, and co-authored Fuckology, a critical analysis of the writings and practices of John Money. With Lih-Mei Liao, Morland co-founded in 2002 Critical Sexology, a continuing interdisciplinary seminar series on gender and sexuality. His audio work includes audio editing, sound design and programming.

== Background ==
Morland was born with an intersex condition and subjected to numerous surgeries in childhood. Much of his writing focuses on the impact of those interventions, in explorations of the ethics of medical intervention, but also the ethics of touch, "desire's reach" and the relationship between intersex experiences and queer theory. He has a doctorate and formerly lectured in cultural criticism and gender studies at Cardiff University in the UK.

== Published works ==
Morland is widely published in journals and books, as both author and editor. Much of his writing draws upon his personal history.

Several articles focus specifically on the issue of sexual sensation, and loss. In "II. Intimate Violations: Intersex and the Ethics of Bodily Integrity" (2008), he argues that intersex management through surgical interventions is an intimate violation caused by lack of sensitivity to the modification of intersex bodies. In "What Can Queer Theory Do for Intersex?" (2009), Morland contrasts queer "hedonic activism" with an experience of insensate intersex bodies to claim that "queerness is characterized by the sensory interrelation of pleasure and shame". In "The Injured World: Intersex and the Phenomenology of Feeling" (2012), Morland describes how one's "capacity to be affected by others" is disrupted by genital objectification and surgery: surgery on intersex genitals is an "injury to flesh" that is "nothing less than a dwindling of the world".

Other works theorize about the meaning of intersex bodies. In ‘The Glans Opens Like a Book’: Writing and Reading the Intersexed Body" (2004), Morland theorizes of surgeries on infants with intersex genitalia as being a "crisis of signification" and readability. In "Is intersexuality real?"' (2010), Morland suggests that "intersexuals need to change what counts as the truth about sex", using "language to describe what their bodies already prove - namely, that maleness and femaleness are not monumental, discrete categories". Faced with assertions that intersex bodies are disgusting, he concludes, "Surgery on intersexuals? Oh, how disgusting". In "Intersex Treatment and the Promise of Trauma" (2011) he discusses the social construction of ambiguity and normality, arguing "that medicine has been, conversely and startlingly, traumatic by design".

In the book chapter "Between Critique and Reform: Ways of Reading the Intersex Controversy", edited by Morgan Holmes, his essay aimed to analyse activist and clinician narratives about the medical management of intersex, focusing on the reform of medicine, in place of critique. The book has been described as "the "go to source" for a contemporary, international representation of intersex studies," making "contributions that are precise, plainly written and very illuminating... the detail is fascinating and somewhat unnerving... beautifully clear and compassionate" (Contemporary Sociology), and "an important collection" (Suzanne Kessler, State University of New York).

In Fuckology (2014), Morland critically analyses the legacy of psychologist and sexologist John Money, including his development of gender identity as a concept, and the utilization of scientific theories about the plasticity of human nature to develop controversial but still widespread treatment protocols for the management of intersex conditions. Fuckology is co-authored with Lisa Downing and Nikki Sullivan, and published by University of Chicago Press in 2014. A chapter on "Gender, Genitals, and the Meaning of Being Human" includes material previously published as "Plastic Man: Intersex, Humanism and the Reimer Case" in 2007. New Scientist described the book as "ably capturing" Money's story while Susan Stryker described the book as a "careful, critical and nuanced" analysis of Money's career.

Morland’s book Intersex: A Manifesto Against Medicalization (2026) takes a deconstructive approach to intersex medicine, drawing on philosophy, psychology, queer studies and social theory to “illuminate the faults of intersex medicine by its own internal logic”. Intersex was described in the journal Science as “a scathing critique of practices that are sanctioned and commonplace” that “compels readers to reconsider decisions that uphold society’s prohibition of intersex at the expense of children’s well-being”. The book was published by Columbia University Press in 2026, and was a finalist for the 2026 Lambda Literary Award for LGBTQ+ Studies.

=== Selected bibliography ===
Selected peer-reviewed articles as author include:

- Morland, Iain (June 2018). "Afterword: Genitals are history". Postmedieval. 9 (2): 209–215. doi:10.1057/s41280-018-0083-5. ISSN 2040-5960. S2CID 187569252.
- Morland, I. (January 2014). "Intersex". TSQ: Transgender Studies Quarterly. 1 (1–2): 111–115. doi:10.1215/23289252-2399758. ISSN 2328-9252.
- Morland, Iain (2012). "The Injured World: Intersex and the Phenomenology of Feeling". differences: A Journal of Feminist Cultural Studies. 23 (2): 20–41. doi:10.1215/10407391-1629803.
- Morland, Iain (November 2010). "Is intersexuality real". Textual Practice. 15 (3): 527–547. doi:10.1080/09502360110070439. S2CID 144246818.
- Morland, I. (January 2009). "What Can Queer Theory Do for Intersex?". GLQ: A Journal of Lesbian and Gay Studies. 15 (2): 285–312. doi:10.1215/10642684-2008-139. ISSN 1064-2684. S2CID 146752050.
- Morland, Iain (2008). "II. Intimate Violations: Intersex and the Ethics of Bodily Integrity". Feminism & Psychology. 18 (3): 425–430. doi:10.1177/0959353508095926. S2CID 144886739.
- Morland, Iain (2005). "'The Glans Opens Like a Book': Writing and Reading the Intersexed Body". Continuum: Journal of Media & Cultural Studies. 19 (3): 335–348. doi:10.1080/103043110500176586. S2CID 145009069.

Books and book chapters include:

- Morland, Iain (2026). Intersex: A Manifesto Against Medicalization. New York: Columbia University Press. ISBN 978-0-231-22177-1.
- Downing, Lisa; Morland, Iain; Sullivan, Nikki (December 2014). Fuckology. Chicago: University of Chicago Press. ISBN 9780226186757.
- Morland, Iain (June 2011). "Intersex Treatment and the Promise of Trauma". In Fisher, Jill (ed.). Gender and the Science of Difference: Cultural Politics of Contemporary Science and Medicine. New Brunswick, New Jersey: Rutgers University Press. ISBN 978-0-8135-5079-4. Archived from the original on 26 December 2014.
- Morland, Iain (2009). "Between Critique and Reform: Ways of Reading the Intersex Controversy". In Holmes, Morgan (ed.). Critical Intersex. Queer Interventions. Farnham, Surrey; Burlington, VT: Ashgate. pp. 191–213. ISBN 978-0-7546-7311-8.

Morland has also edited two books:

- Intersex and After, an issue of GLQ: A Journal of Lesbian and Gay Studies in 2009. Notable contributors included Alice Dreger, Vernon Rosario and Del LaGrace Volcano, as well as Sarah Creighton, Ellen K. Feder, Julie Greenberg and Nikki Sullivan. Morland also contributed an essay, "What Can Queer Theory Do for Intersex?".
- Queer Theory, edited with Dino Willox and published in 2004 in Palgrave Macmillan's Readers in Cultural Criticism series. This book presents fifteen articles on sexuality, gender studies and other aspects of queer studies. Notable contributors include Judith Butler, Patrick Califia, Cheryl Chase, Larry Kramer, Del LaGrace Volcano, and Stephen Whittle.
