= Laura Vila Kremer =

Actress and intersex activist

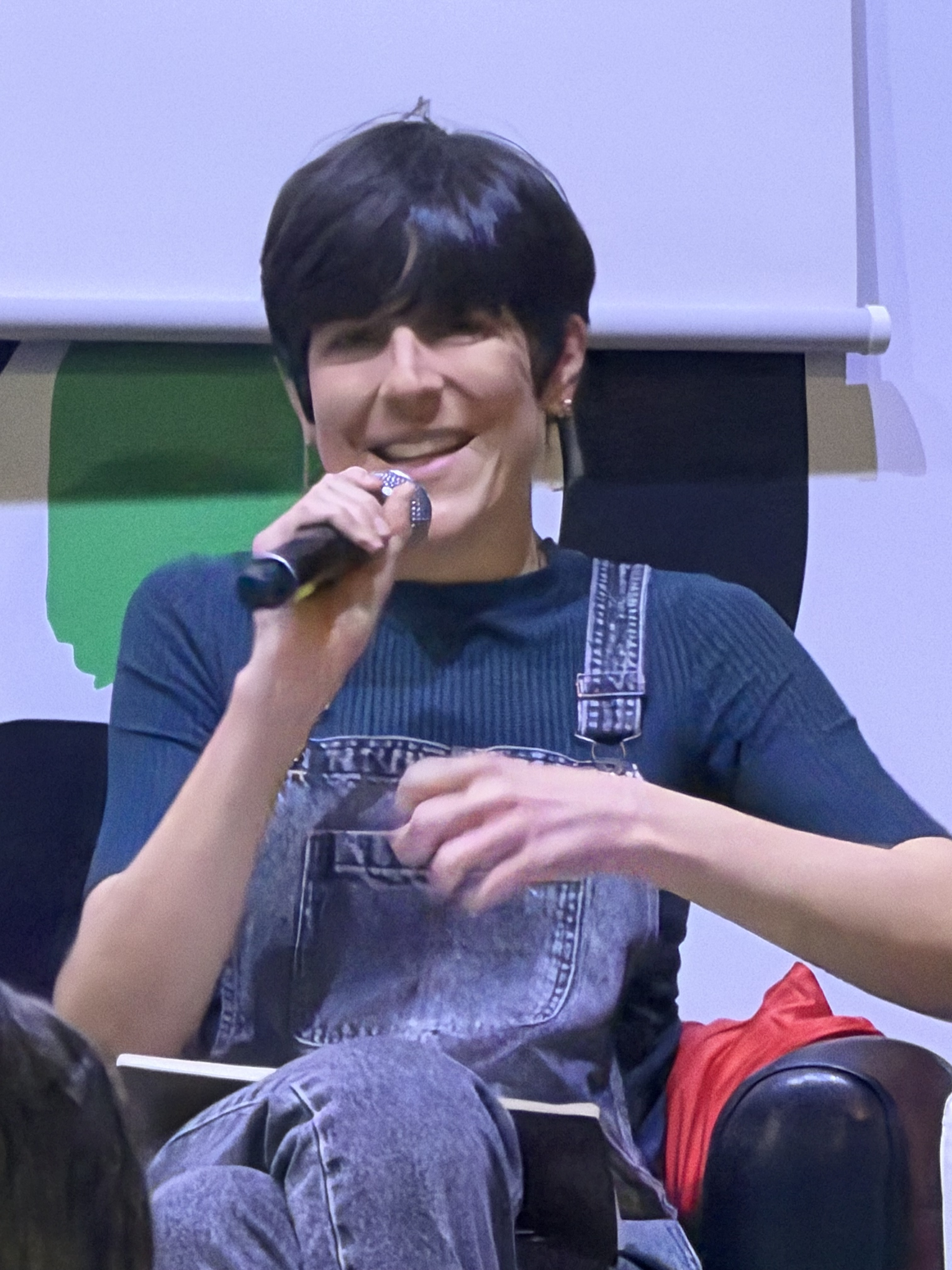
- Vila Kremer in 2026
- Born: 1985; Barcelona
- Education: Autonomous University of Barcelona (BA)
- Occupations: Performance artist and intersex rights activist
- Organization: Que no salga de aquí

Laura Vila Kremer (born 1985) is a Catalan performance artist and intersex rights activist. She is a part of the artistic collective "Que no salga de aquí" ('Don't let it get out of here' in Spanish), who advocate for the medical depathologisation of intersex people using drama, performing arts, and art history. She is also a co-creator of the theatrical production "Hermafrodites a cavall o la rebel·lió del desig", a work that addresses the experiences and challenges faced by intersex individuals.

== Background and early life ==
Laura Vila Kremer was born in Catalonia, Spain.

== Career ==
Graduating in Audiovisual Communication from the Autonomous University of Barcelona, Vila later decided to pursue a career in dramaturgy. She has been involved in numerous theatrical works in and outside Catalonia. Notable works include "17 simpàtiques maneres d'acabar amb el capitalisme" ('17 nice ways to end capitalism') by the Casa Real Company in Barcelona, and performances at the Sala Cuarta Pared theatre in Madrid, including "Voluptas, trenquem estereotips" ('Pleasure, let's break stereotypes'), "L'amansi(pa)ment de les fúries" at La Villarroel theatre, the short documentary "Se receta silencio" ('Silence is prescribed') directed by Miquel Missé Sánchez (2021), which won the Jury Award for Best Human Rights Short Film at the International Festival of Cinema and Sexual Diversity (2022), and "Cabaret Trans".

=== Hermafrodites a cavall o la rebel·lió del desig ===
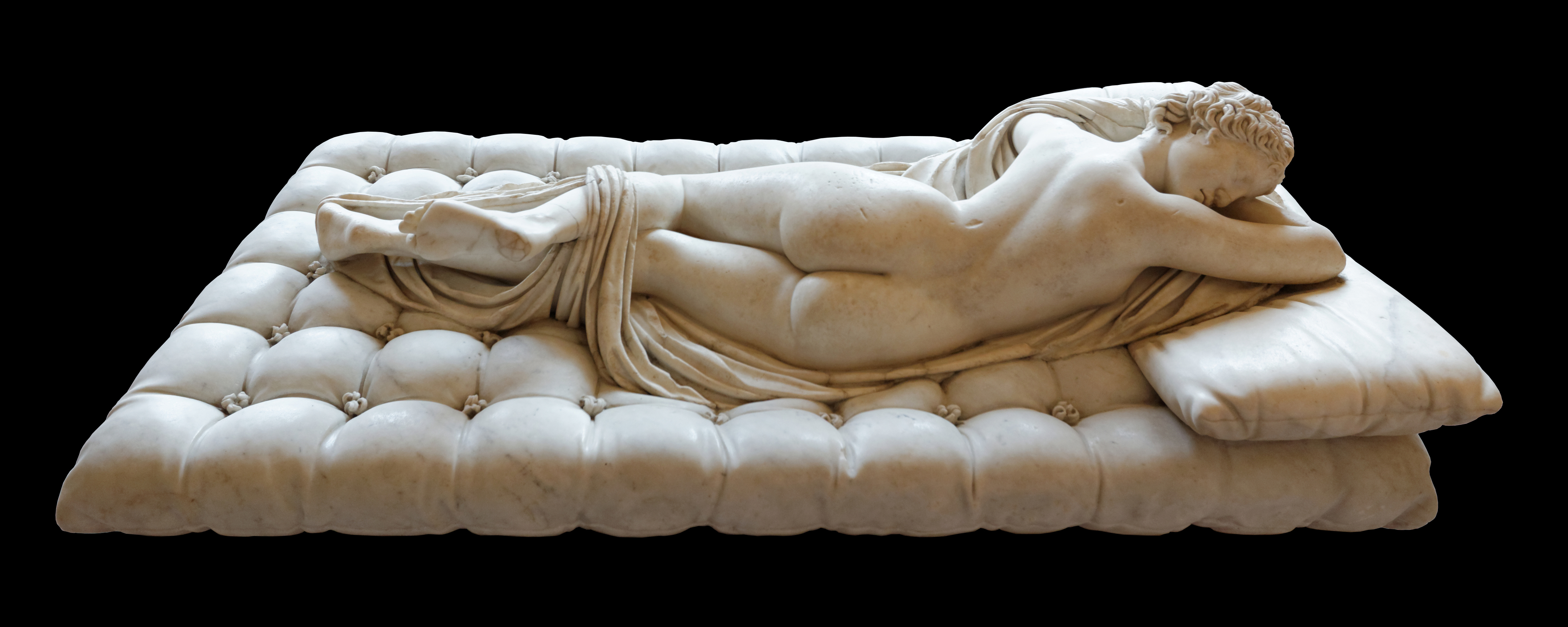
The Sleeping Hermaphroditus (1620, Gian Lorenzo Bernini) is a recurring image in Vila's work "Hermafrodites a cavall o la rebel·lió del desig".

"Hermafrodites a cavall o la rebel·lió del desig" ('Hermaphrodites on horseback or the rebellion of desire') is a theatrical production co-created by Kremer and playwright Raquel Loscos. It is a first-person narrated documentary work informed by Kremer's personal experience, accompanied by eight other testimonies from intersex individuals, and uses the term "hermaphrodite" in order to re-appropriate the term. It discusses the issues faced by intersex individuals, who are often pathologised or without any laws to protect and support them. During the 2021–2022 season, this work was presented in Pamplona, at the Tàrrega Theatre Festival (currently known as FiraTàrrega), at Teatre Tantarantana in Barcelona, as part of the Grec Festival, and at the Ateneu Popular de Nou Barris. Additionally, it won the 2022 Critic's Award and an artistic residency at Teatre Tantarantana (2022).
