= Mani Mitchell =

Intersex activist

Mani Mitchell MNZM
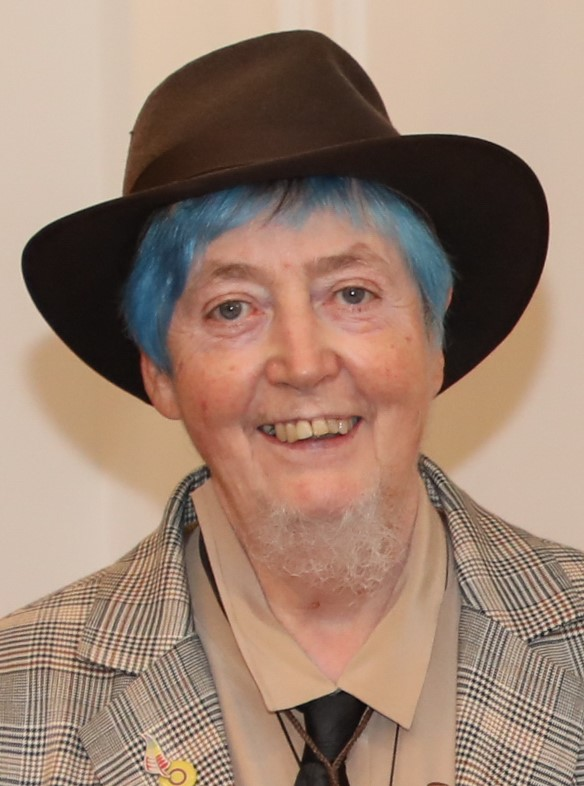
- Mitchell in 2021
- Born: 1953 (age 72–73); Waikato, New Zealand
- Occupation: Counsellor
- Known for: Intersex activist and educator
- Television: Intersexion (2012); Yellow for Hermaphrodite: Mani's Story (2003)
- Website: www.manimitchell.com

Mani Bruce Mitchell MNZM (born 1953) is an intersex activist and counsellor from Wellington, New Zealand. In 2021, Mitchell was recognised as a Member of the New Zealand Order of Merit.

== Early life ==
Mitchell was born and raised in the central North Island on a sheep and cattle farm and educated at Taupo-nui-a-Tia College and the University of Waikato. Identified as a "hermaphrodite" at birth, Mitchell underwent "non-consensual genital 'feminising' surgeries" as a child, and is also a survivor of sexual abuse.

== Career ==
Since 1996, Mitchell has been actively involved in education on intersex and gender variance issues, lecturing at universities and running workshops around the world, and was also involved in the production of several TV documentaries, a film, and a photography book. Mitchell is a member of the New Zealand Association of Counsellors, World Professional Association for Transgender Health and the International Transactional Analysis Association.

Mitchell is the Executive Director of Intersex Trust Aotearoa New Zealand, also known as Intersex Awareness New Zealand.

Mitchell has also narrated the documentary Intersexion (2012), directed by Grant Lahood, which features the story of Mani Mitchell and many other individuals, and looks at how intersex people navigate their way through life.

Mitchell also helped organise the third International Intersex Forum in November/December 2013, and participated in a meeting of New Zealand and Australian intersex organisations in Darlington, Sydney, Australia, leading to publication of the Darlington Statement policy platform.

In 2021, Mitchell spoke of amazement at seeing "intersex people 'moving out of that shame and secrecy and into a playful, joyful place' over the years".

== Recognition ==
In the 2021 Queen's Birthday Honours, Mitchell was appointed a Member of the New Zealand Order of Merit, for their work as a human rights advocate and educator. Mitchell is thought to be one of the first intersex non-binary New Zealanders to receive the award.
