= Teresa Lamoneda =

Cuban intersex soldier

- Born: c. 20th century Havana, Cuba
- Allegiance: Second Spanish Republic
- Branch: International Brigades
- Service years: 1936–1939
- Rank: Lieutenant
- Known for: Intersex Cuban soldier in the Spanish Civil War
- Conflicts: Spanish Civil War
- Awards: 2 military decorations (unnamed)
- Other work: Dancer

Teresa Lamoneda (c. 20th century) was a Cuban intersex soldier who fought in the Spanish Civil War.

== Biography ==
Teresa was born to Afro-Cuban parents in the 20th century in the city of Havana. In 1935, she moved to Madrid to train as a dancer.

On 17 and 18 July 1936, she was in Toledo when the 1936 Coup d'état happened, sparking the Spanish Civil War. During the uprising, the insurgents attacked and injured her, shooting her in the groin, while her boyfriend, a young Galician, was captured and imprisoned.

After recovering from the shot in a hospital in Madrid, she enlisted to fight on the Republican side on the front of Talavera de la Reina, where she reunited with her partner. During this time, she was promoted to the rank of lieutenant and received two decorations. In 1938, she was interviewed by American journalist Lorna Lindsley, who later published the interview as part of the book War Is People, which was published five years later. In 1939, already a lieutenant, she was part of the crew of a ship that evacuated republican fighters from Valencia, transferring them to Barcelona. There, she met Brigadier Joseph Almudéver.

On one occasion, she stated that after the war, she had planned to move to Russia, but it is unknown if she survived the end of the war. Lorna, the journalist who interviewed her, claimed to have heard rumors that Teresa had died in the Gurs concentration camp in France, but there is no evidence of this fact.
