= Cary Gabriel Costello =

Professor and advocate

Dr. Cary Gabriel Costello
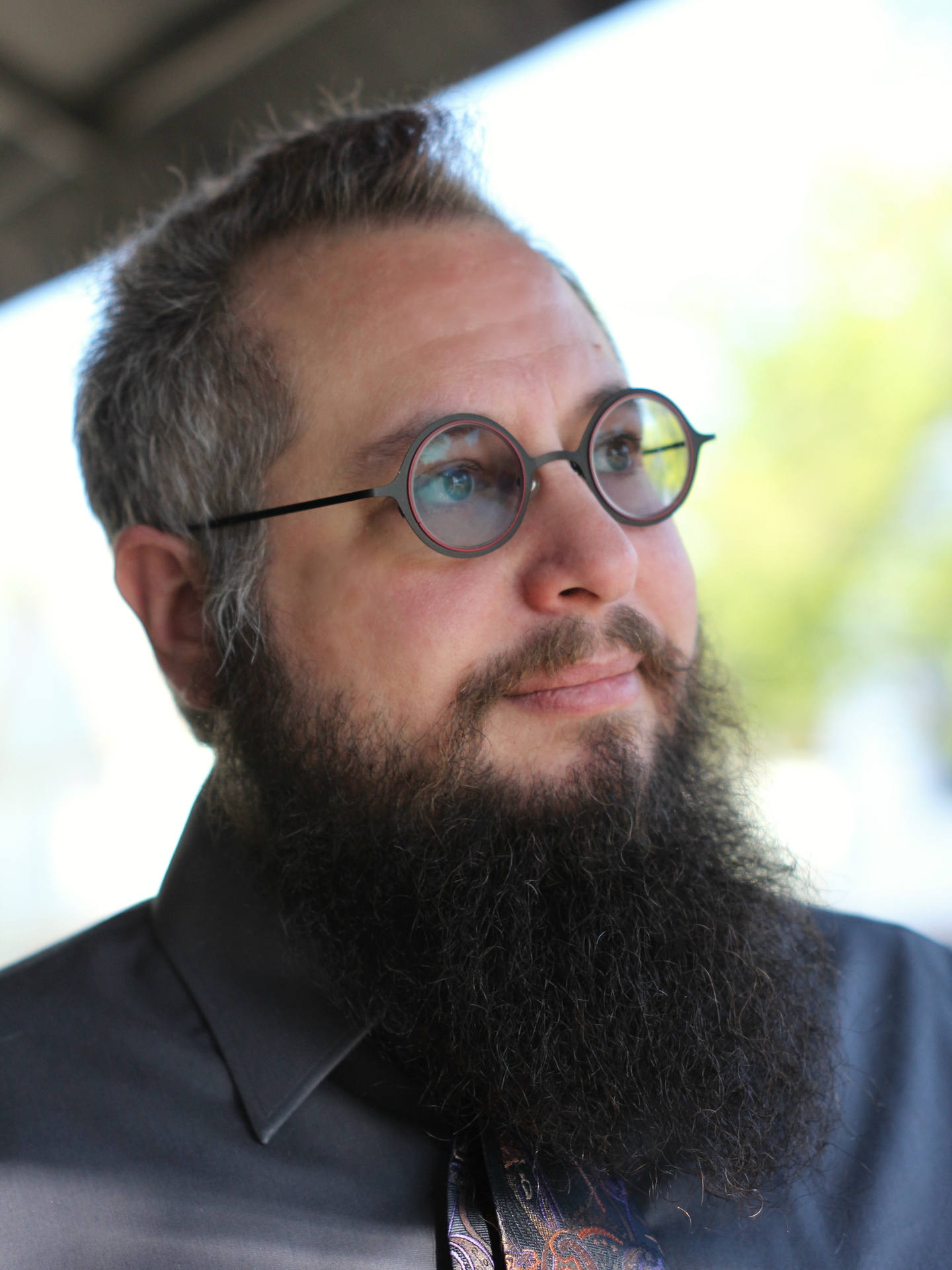
- Education: Yale College (BA, 1986); Harvard Law School (JD, 1990); University of California, Berkeley (MA, 1994; PhD, 1999)
- Occupation: Professor
- Employer: University of Wisconsin, Milwaukee
- Known for: Transgender and intersex advocacy

Cary Gabriel Costello is an intersex trans male professor and advocate for transgender and intersex rights. His areas of study include identity, sexuality, privilege, and marginalization.

== Career and personal life ==
Assigned female at birth, Costello first attempted a gender transition in 1991, while working as an attorney in Washington, D.C. Due to the discrimination he experienced, he postponed his transition, and left the legal profession to pursue a degree and career in sociology. He transitioned to male after securing tenure as an associate professor of Sociology at the University of Wisconsin, Milwaukee, where he leads the LGBT Studies program.

Costello has advocated for transgender and intersex people on issues including intersex surgery, eugenics, bathroom bills, TSA airline passenger screening, and the sometimes fraught relationships between intersex and transgender communities. He has analyzed the controversy over the gender testing of South African athlete Caster Semenya from an intersex perspective. Costello has suggested using the term ipso gender instead of cisgender for intersex people who agree with their medically assigned sex.

Costello has a daughter, and is married to an intersex trans woman.

In February 2017, Costello and his wife lost access to transition-related healthcare when the state of Wisconsin reinstated an exclusion on these services. Additionally, his employer required that he obtain and submit new proof of his gender identity, despite the fact that he had transitioned over a decade earlier. A blog post Costello wrote about the situation went viral.

== Selected publications ==
- Almeida Ana; Vásquez Elizabeth (January 2010). "Caster Semenya: Una Perspectiva Intersex". Cuerpos Distintos: Ocho Años de Activismo Transfeminista en Ecuador. Manthra Editores. pp. 69–72.
- Batchelor, Bob (December 7, 2011). "The Real Me: Selfhood in the Virtual World". Cult Pop Culture: How the Fringe Became Mainstream. ABC-CLIO. pp. 187–204. ISBN 9780313357817.
- Mindy Stombler; Dawn M. Baunach; Wendy Simonds; Elroi J. Windsor; Elisabeth O. Burgess (December 2013). "Sexuality in a Virtual World". Sex Matters: The Sexuality and Society Reader (4th ed.). W. W. Norton & Company. pp. 178–185.
- Gibson, Margaret F. (January 2014). "Not a 'Medical Miracle': Intersex Reproduction and the Medical Enforcement of Binary Sex and Gender". Maternity and Motherhood: Narrative and Theoretical Perspectives on Queer Conception, Birth and Parenting. Demeter Press. pp. 63–80.
- Costello, Cary (January 2016). "Saving Face: Disfigurement and the Politics of Appearance". Contemporary Sociology. 45 (1): 91–93. doi:10.1177/0094306115621526pp. S2CID 146436005.
- Horlacher, Stefan, ed. (November 10, 2016). "Intersex and Trans* Communities: Commonalities and Tensions". Transgender and Intersex: Theoretical, Practical, and Artistic Perspectives. Palgrave Macmillan. pp. 83–113. doi:10.1057/978-1-349-71325-7. ISBN 978-1-349-71325-7.

== See also ==
- Intersex rights in the United States
- Transgender rights in the United States
