= Vernon Rosario =

American psychiatrist and medical historian

Vernon A. Rosario II (born 1962) is an American psychiatrist and medical historian who studies human sexuality. His recent work has focused on transgender and intersex youth, and he has served as chair of the medical advisory board for Intersex Society of North America.

== Life and career ==
Rosario earned undergraduate degrees in French literature and biomedical engineering from Brown University in 1986. He received his Ph.D. in the History of Science from Harvard University in 1993, and his M.D. from the Harvard-MIT Division of Health Sciences and Technology in 1995. Rosario completed a residency and fellowship with the UCLA Neuropsychiatric Institute in 2002. Since then he has been in private practice and been a psychiatric consultant at Gay and Lesbian Adolescent Social Services in Los Angeles. He has held a UCLA clinical teaching position since 2003, and is currently an Associate Clinical Professor in the Department of Psychiatry.

Rosario has published in English, French, and Spanish, and his books include Science and Homosexualities and The Erotic Imagination: French Histories of Perversity. He has been a longtime activist in eliminating homophobia, and he has criticized author J. Michael Bailey’s stereotypic depiction of gay men in The Man Who Would Be Queen. As a child and adolescent psychiatrist, one major focus has been helping young LGBT people come out to their families. Rosario has also expressed concern for excessive specialization in psychiatry, focusing on neuroscience while ignoring other factors. As chair of the LGBT Committee of the Group for the Advancement of Psychiatry, he edited and published a web-based course on LGBT mental health.

== Selected publications ==
- Bennett P, Rosario VA, eds. (1995). Solitary Pleasures: The Historical, Literary, and Artistic Discourses of Autoeroticism. Routledge, ISBN 978-0-415-91173-3
- Rosario VA (1996). Pointy Penises, Fashion Crimes, and Hysterical Mollies: The Pederasts' Inversions, In Homosexuality in Modern France, ed. Jeffrey W. Merrick and Bryant Ragan, 146–76. New York: Oxford University Press
- Rosario VA, ed. (1997). Science and Homosexualities. Routledge ISBN 978-0-415-91502-1
- Rosario VA (1997). The Erotic Imagination: French Histories of Perversity. Oxford University Press, ISBN 978-0-19-510483-7
- Rosario VA (2000). L'irrésistible ascension du pervers entre littérature et psychiatrie. Trans. Guy Le Gaufey. Editions et Publications de l’Ecole Lacanienne ISBN 2-908855-49-6
- Rosario VA (2002). Homosexuality and Science: A Guide to the Debates. ABC-CLIO, ISBN 978-1-57607-281-3
- Allouch J, Rosario V, Viltard M (2003). Litoral 33: Una Analitica Pariasitaria Raro, Muy Raro. Buenos Aires, ISBN 85-02-00333-X
- Rosario VA (2004). The Biology of Gender and the Construction of Sex? GLQ: A Journal of Lesbian and Gay Studies, Volume 10, Number 2, pp. 280–287
- Rosario VA (2005). Medicine, Medicalization, and the Medical Model. Encyclopedia of Lesbian, Gay, Bisexual and Transgender History in America
- Rosario VA (2006). An Interview with Cheryl Chase. Journal of Gay and Lesbian Psychotherapy. Volume: 10 Issue: 2 Pages: 93 - 104.
- Rosario VA (2007). The History of Aphallia and the Intersexual Challenge to Sex/Gender. In The Blackwell Companion to Lesbian, Gay, Bisexual, Transgender, and Queer Studies, ed. George E. Haggerty & Molly McGarry, 262–281. Oxford: Blackwell Publishing.
- Rosario VA (2008). Afterword: Sex and Heredity at the Fin de Siècle. In Sexuality at the Fin-de-Siècle: The Makings of a "Central Problem," ed. Peter Cryle & Christopher Forth, 168–190. Newark, DE, University of Delaware Press.
- Rosario VA (2009). Quantum Sex: Intersex and the Molecular Deconstruction of Sex. GLQ 15.2: pp. 267–284 .
