= LGBTIQ+ Health Australia =

Australian health organisation

LGBTIQ+ Health Australia (formerly the National LGBTI Health Alliance)
- Formation: 2007
- Type: NGO
- Purpose: Peak health body
- Region served: Australia
- Chief Executive Officer: Nicky Bath
- Website: www.lgbtiqhealth.org.au

LGBTIQ+ Health Australia (formerly the National LGBTI Health Alliance) is a peak health organisation for LGBT and intersex organisations in Australia. A not-for-profit company, it was established in August 2007.

== Key areas of activity ==
Key focus areas include ageing, mental health, suicide prevention, intersex health, transgender health, and data collection.

=== Ageing ===
The organisation led consultations on an inclusive aged care strategy for the Department of Health that helped lead to the development of a national strategy.

=== Intersex health ===
In 2013, the Alliance called for the implementation of the recommendations of a Senate Committee report on the 'Involuntary or coerced sterilisation of intersex people'. The Alliance had earlier made submissions and participated in a hearing on the issue.

=== Mental health and suicide prevention ===
A major report on mental health and suicide prevention, prepared by PricewaterhouseCoopers, was published in August 2011. The report found that "there are higher levels of depression, anxiety and other mental health problems in the LGBTI populations, with evidence suggesting attempted suicide is 3.5 to 14 times" higher.

In September 2013, the Alliance joined a national campaign calling for a "National LGBTI Suicide Prevention Strategy", with the aim of halving suicide rates by 2023.

=== Trans and intersex health issues ===
The Alliance launched a report on trans and intersex health issues at the federal Parliament House in November 2012. With Organisation Intersex International Australia, the Alliance was also consulted by the Department of Health and Ageing leading to improvements in access to Medicare services, reported in July 2013.

== Health in Difference national conference ==
The Alliance organises a biannual conference, Health in Difference. The 2013 conference was held in Melbourne in April. Plenary sessions were recorded by JOY 94.9.

== Chief Executive Officer ==
Nicky Bath joined LGBTIQ+ Health Australia in August 2018 as Chief Executive Officer and brings with her experience she gained from roles such as the Associate Director, LGBTI Health Programming and Development at ACON, Manager of the Harm Reduction and Viral Hepatitis Branch at the NSW Ministry of Health as well as several senior positions in State and National drug user organisations including CEO of the NSW Users and AIDS Association.

Nicky Bath was also a part of the LGBTIQA+ Health and Wellbeing 10-Year National Action Plan Expert Advisory Group which informed the Australian Government about the health needs of people in the LGBTIQA+ community.

In late 2013, Warren Talbot announced his resignation as executive director, for health reasons, and Andrew Little was appointed as acting executive director. Rebecca Reynolds, formerly the manager of Twenty10 took up the position in February 2014.

== Member organisations ==
Member organisations include:

- A Gender Agenda (ACT)
- ACON
- Androgen Insensitivity Syndrome Support Group Australia
- Australian Federation of AIDS Organisations
- AusPATH (Australian Professional Association of Trans Health)
- The Freedom Centre (WA)
- Organisation Intersex International Australia
- Queensland AIDS Council
- Transgender Victoria
- Thorne Harbour Health
- Victorian Pride Lobby
- Working It Out (Tasmania)
- Western Australian AIDS Council
- GRAI (WA) - GLBTI Rights in Ageing Inc

== Affiliations ==
LGBTIQ+ Health Australia is a member of the Young and Well Co-operative Research Centre and the National Coalition for Suicide Prevention.

== See also ==
- LGBT rights in Australia
- Intersex rights by country
- Intersex human rights
