= Orchids, My Intersex Adventure =

2010 Australian documentary film

Orchids, My Intersex Adventure is an auto-biographical 2010 documentary about one woman's struggle to understand her own intersex variation while interviewing other intersex people. Director Phoebe Hart used digital cameras and a small crew including her sister, Bonnie Hart, while on a road trip of self-discovery through various areas of Australia, recording some personal stories disclosed to her by the other intersex individuals.

This documentary took six years for the principal documenters (sisters Phoebe and Bonnie Hart) to film, using a variety of cameras including semi-professional digital cameras, domestic VHS camcorders, and Super 8.

== Synopsis ==
Phoebe Hart was told she would never menstruate nor have children, but the reasons were not discussed and the topic was taboo. Initially, her parents refused to be filmed at all.

When Hart was 17 years of age, her mother told her the family secret, that Hart had testes in her abdomen. Hart was pressured into an invasive surgery to remove her undescended testes, and in the documentary she faces the traumatic emotional scars from that operation. Her sister, Bonnie Hart, shares the same condition.

Hart embarked on a road trip around Australia in an effort to hear the stories of other intersex people for the purpose of self-reflection. This self-reflection engendered her resilience and emotional healing, but she realised that she cannot escape the pervasive impact her condition had on all her relationships. Hart and her husband James desired to start a family but her infertility and the stress of the adoption process strained their marriage. She began to understand the scope of difficulties her parents faced when they made decisions on her behalf.

This turning point in her personal development convinced her parents to be interviewed. Hart was excited but apprehensive, and wondered whether talking openly with her mother would give her the answers she had long sought.

== Awards ==
The film won the ATOM Award for Best Documentary General. Other awards include:

- Australian Directors Guild Award
- Best Direction in a Documentary (Stand Alone); Australian Academy Cinema Television Arts Awards
- Best Documentary Under 1 Hour; Honolulu Film Festival, Winner
- Gold Kahuna Award; Brisbane International Film Festival
- Best Documentary; Chéries-Chéris Film Festival, France
- Prix Spécial du Jury du Film Documentaire; MujerDoc International Festival of Documentary Cinema on Gender, Spain
- Best Short Documentary; Best Documentary at Mix Copenhagen; John Deen Memorial Award at the Spokane International LGBT Film Festival.
