= List of fictional intersex characters =

This is a list of intersex characters in fiction, i.e. fictional characters that either self-identify as intersex or have been identified by outside parties to be intersex. Listed characters are either recurring characters, cameos, guest stars, or one-off characters.

The names are organized alphabetically by surname (i.e. last name), or by single name if the character does not have a surname. If more than two characters are in one entry, the last name of the first character is used.

== Animation and anime ==
Characters	Title	Character debut date	Notes	Country
Ryo Asuka	Devilman Crybaby	January 5, 2018	Ryo Asuka is a genderless angel who is Akira Fudo's best friend, while Akira is the protagonist. Akira was the first person to show him kindness, causing him to become deeply attached. Near the end, Ryo remembers he is Satan, an intersex fallen angel who fell out of favor with God when he challenged God's authority for killing the demons and replacing them with humans. Satan set out to start a war between humans and demons and was reborn as a male. He fell in love with Akira and subconsciously had him turned into a devilman (a demon human hybrid) to ensure he would survive the war and be by his side. By the end of the series, Satan realizes he loves Akira despite having previously believed love did not exist and cries and mourns Akira's death. Akira is in a relationship with a woman, but his feelings towards Ryo have been described as homoerotic.	Japan
Crimvael "Crim"	Interspecies Reviewers	January 11, 2020	A well-endowed intersex angel with a broken halo, Crimvael has male and female genitalia, as noted throughout the series. Despite Crim’s feminine appearance, they chooses to identify as male upon meeting Stunk and Zel in episode 1, to avoid the two from trying anything perverted on them. Crim hinted to be bisexual in episode 3 and in episode 9, the narrator uses the pronoun "they" to refer to Crim. This is due to Crim having no set gender, much like the rest of the angels, and the narrator takes note on that.	Japan
Luca Esposito	Astra Lost in Space	July 3, 2019	Luca, in the anime and manga Astra Lost in Space, is an artist and talented engineer on board the Astra. He was raised as and mostly identifies as a boy, and comes out as intersex halfway through the story, in the episode "Secret", not considering himself a man or a woman. He was described by Michele Liu of Anime News Network as "unique" since Luca is a main character which is born intersex rather than "altered by sci-fi space diseases or external influence," with Liu also describing Luca as bisexual.	Japan
Iena Madaraba	Seton Academy: Join the Pack!	February 18, 2020	Iena Madaraba, also known as Yena or Hyena, is a spotted hyena with female genitalia and is confused about her true gender & sexuality. Even after her real gender is proven, Hitomi reassures Iena to just be the tomboyish she wants. It is hinted on multiple occasions that Iena and Hitomi have mutual feelings for each other. In the future, Iena is a martial artist. After failing to feel feminine in various episodes, she claims out that she will still be a male inside in episodes such as "The Wild Habits of a Troubled Animal". Crunchyroll described Iena as a "gender-ambiguous hyena person."	Japan
Ruby Moon	Cardcaptor Sakura	September 7, 1999	Ruby Moon has no biological sex. They are always seen presenting as female, even though Spinel Sun often asks her why don't they present as male for a change as shown in episodes like "Sakura and the Mysterious Transfer Student". At some points, Ruby Moon states that their gender does not matter because they are not actually human and also that girls have cuter clothes. They appear to have a crush on Touya. Like Syaoran, Sakura, Touya, Yukita, and Tomoyo, they also reappear in Cardcaptor Sakura: Clear Card.	Japan
Stevonnie	Steven Universe	January 15, 2015	Stevonnie is a fusion of both Steven and Connie. Steven and Connie identify as male and female respectively, but the gender of Stevonnie is difficult to describe, with series creator Rebecca Sugar describing it as the "living relationship between Steven and Connie." Stevonnie is commonly referred to with gender neutral pronouns (such as the singular they), while male and female characters seem to be physically attracted to Stevonnie. Stevonnie also appears in a non-speaking role in the episode "Bismuth Casual" of the limited epilogue series, Steven Universe Future. In an in-universe public service announcement about self esteem, Stevonnie is specifically labeled as intersex.	United States
Stevonnie	Steven Universe Future	March 6, 2020		United States
Izana Shinatose	Knights of Sidonia	April 10, 2014	Izana belongs to a new, nonbinary third gender that originated during the hundreds of years of human emigration into space, as first shown in the episode "Commencement." Izana later turns into a girl after falling in love with Nagate Tanasake.	Japan

== Comics and manga ==
Characters	Name of comic	Years	Notes
Aggie	Go Get a Roomie!	2010–Present	In this comic, which explores sexual themes, Aggie, Roomie's past lover, reveals she was born intersex in a radio interview.
Belzeba	Belzeba figlia del Diavolo	1977-1978	In this erotic Italian comic, Belzeba is the intersex daughter of the Devil.
Comet	Adventure Comics	1989-1991	Comet is an intersex character, who changed their form from female to male, and Comet later began relationship with Blithe, since she loved both their forms (revealing that Blithe is bisexual).
Comet	Action Comics	1989-1991	Comet is an intersex character, who changed their form from female to male, and Comet later began relationship with Blithe, since she loved both their forms (revealing that Blithe is bisexual).
Comet	Supergirl	1989-1991	Comet is an intersex character, who changed their form from female to male, and Comet later began relationship with Blithe, since she loved both their forms (revealing that Blithe is bisexual).
Desire	The Sandman	1989–Present	Desire is one of the Endless.
Heather Coven	Rain (webcomic)	2011-2022	Heather Coven is an intersex woman in the webcomic Rain. She is stated to have Complete androgen insensitivity syndrome. She is 46, XY intersex, saying that she "I was born without a uterus. Or ovaries. And a testicle removed when I was a baby. Never had a period. Will never have kids."
Anastacia Elizabeth Rubina	Rain (webcomic)	2013-2022	Anastacia Elizabeth Rubina (Ana) is a transgender intersex woman in the webcomic Rain. When she was born, her "parts were considered... ambiguous", and so was surgically changed to be more masculine. Not long after her introduction, she had "surgery to correct that doctor's corrections". Due to her being (albeit arbitrarily) assigned male at birth, she is transgender as well as intersex, although she prefers to not be considered to be so.
Rebis	Doom Patrol	1963-1968	Rebis is a character in the comic series Doom Patrol. Formed from the fusion of Negative Man (Larry Trainor), the negative spirit inhabiting him, and his doctor Eleanor Poole, Rebis identifies as both male and female.
Richard Plantagenet, later Richard III of England	Requiem of the Rose King	2013–Present	In this manga adaptation of Richard III, Richard is portrayed as intersex instead of hunchbacked as the character is normally depicted in the original play.
Ystina, the Shining Knight	Demon Knights	2011-2013	Ystina is revealed as DC Comics's first intersex character in Demon Knights #14.

== Film ==
Characters	Title or Franchise	Actors	Years	Notes	Country
Half Woman-Half Man	Freaks	Josephine Joseph	1932	Josephine Joseph's only acting performance is the first (mis)representation of an intersex person in cinema.	United States
Cardinal Vincent Benitez	Conclave	Carlos Diehz	2024	Benitez is a Mexican archbishop working in Afghanistan and one of candidates for the Pope.	United States
Rebeca Duarte	Both	Jackie Parker	2005	Rebeca Duarte in the movie Both. The movie is unusual for being a film about an intersex issue directed by an intersex person, Lisset Barcellos.	United States
Frankie	Fixed	River Gallo	2025	Frankie is a Doberman.	United States
Alex Kraken	XXY	Inés Efron	2007	Alex Kraken, lead character in the Argentinian movie XXY, is intersex.	Argentina
Spork	Spork	Savannah Stehlin	2011	Spork is the lead character in the eponymous movie which is a musical comedy.	United States

== Literature ==
Characters	Work	Author	Years	Description
Cornelius Brunner	The Final Programme	Michael Moorcock	1965	Cornelius Brunner, the result of a physical merging of the protagonist Jerry Cornelius and Miss Brunner in this novel.
Therem Harth rem ir Estraven	The Left Hand of Darkness	Ursula K. Le Guin	1969	Therem is a character in this science fiction novel about a planet whose inhabitants have no genitalia or secondary sex characteristics, except for one week every month where they get the urge to mate, and temporarily develop either male or female (randomly) genitalia and gametes. After the reproduction is finished, the "male" returns to their neutral state and the "female" carries the baby and then returns to their neutral state. Thus, the planet has no concept of gender distinction, and, since anyone could get pregnant, childcare and family planning are easily accessed.
Fawn Singleton Farrell	No Matter How Much You Promise to Cook or Pay the Rent You Blew It Cauze Bill Bailey Ain't Never Coming Home Again	Edgardo Vega Yunqué	2003	Fawn Singleton Farrell is the half-sister of main character Vidamía Farrell, in this novel.
Ilario	Ilario, A Story of the First History	Mary Gentle	2006-2007	Ilario is the lead character in this set of alternate history novels.
Keral	The World Wreckers	Marion Zimmer Bradley	1971	Keral is a member of an alien species in this science fiction novel.
Kirsten Lattimer	None of the Above	I. W. Gregorio	2015	Kirsten, homecoming queen and champion hurdler, finds her life turned upside-down after a diagnosis with androgen insensitivity syndrome in this novel.
Callie Stephanides	Middlesex	Jeffrey Eugenides	2002	Callie "Cal" Stephanides is an intersex character in this novel.
Bel Thorne	Vorkosigan Saga	Lois McMaster Bujold	1986–Present	Bel Thorne is an intersex ship captain in this series of science fiction novels and uses it/its pronouns.
Fitz Wahram	2312	Kim Stanley Robinson	2013	Fitz Wahram is a possibly intersex character in this science fiction novel.
Max Walker	Golden Boy	Abigail Tarttelin	2013	Max is a lead character in this award-winning novel.
Annabel/Wayne	Annabel	Kathleen Winter	2010	Annabel/Wayne is an intersex character in this novel who was born intersex but is raised as a man.
Wraeththu	Wraeththu	Storm Constantine	1987-1993	Wraeththu are a post-apocalyptic species in this set of novels.
Sadako Yamamura	Ring	Koji Suzuki	1991-2013	Sadako Yamamura is an antagonist in this novel series, later made into films.

== Live-action television ==
Characters	Actor	Show	Years	Notes
Amy Andrews	Jessica Campbell	Freaks and Geeks	1999–2000	Amy, girlfriend of Ken Miller in teen comedy/drama TV series, was said to be a groundbreaking intersex character on television.
Buba (Isabela Gonzaga Inocêncio)	Maria Luisa Mendonça	Renascer	1993	Buba had a romantic relationship with João Pedro, one of the sons of José Inocêncio, the protagonist of the soap opera. At the time, the term "hermaphrodite" was used to describe Buba's variation.
Cacau	Not known	Renascer	2024	Teca, Cacau's mother, gives birth with the help of Morena, Buba and Inácia. Cacau's intersexness is revealed by the doctor.
Vincent Clarkson	Daphnée Duplaix (2004–2008), Phillip Jeanmarie (2006–2008), Siena Goines (2007)	Passions	1999–2008	An intersex character in this NBC/DirecTV soap opera who becomes pregnant with his father's son.
Lauren Cooper	Bailey De Young	Faking It	2014–2018	Lauren is a character in MTV scripted comedy and said to be the first intersex series regular on television.
Lorraine Finster	Minnie Driver	Will & Grace	1998–2006; 2017–2020	In the season 6 episode "The Accidental Tsuris", recurring character Lorraine is established to have been born intersex. Lorraine's parents had her operated on, after which they raised Lorraine as a girl.
Jake	Not known	Emily Owens, M.D.	2012–2013	An intersex baby in episode "Emily and... the Question of Faith" (S1, ep.6).
Peta	Leeanna Walsman	Janet King	2014–2017	Peta is character revealed as intersex in the final episode of the second Janet King series (S2, ep.8).
Raven	Amanda Saenz	Faking It	2014–2018	Raven was notable for being the first intersex character played by an openly intersex person.
Alexandria 'Alex' Robinson	Cameron Richardson	House	2004–2012	Alex, a patient in the season 2 episode "Skin Deep", is revealed to be intersex. The handling of the character was labeled offensive by the Intersex Society of North America
Toby	Beattie Edmondson	Upstart Crow	2016–present	The series 3 episode "The Most Unkindest Cut of All!" features Toby, an Elizabethan actor who is intersex.
Aunt Stamatina	Giouli Tsagaraki	Serres	2022–2025	Main character across the whole series. In the second season, she discovers she is intersex, was operated on as a baby, and this has been concealed from her for her whole life.

== Video games ==
Characters	Title	Voice actor	Notes	Developer
Bomb	Angry Birds 2	Altara Michelle	A black common loon with the power to cause explosions. In the "better together" microtransaction, the player is able to buy him an outfit adorned with the intersex flag.	Rovio Entertainment
Fine Motion	Umamusume: Pretty Derby	Chinami Hashimoto	An anthropomorphized version of the real racehorse Fine Motion. Within the world of Umamusume, characters based on racehorses wear accessories on their ears corresponding to whether or not the real horse was a stallion or a mare. The real horse Fine Motion is intersex, and this represented in game by Fine Motion having clover ornaments on both of her ears.	Cygames

== See also ==
- Intersex representation in film
- Intersex literature
- Intersex representation in television
- List of intersex people
- List of fictional polyamorous characters
- List of animated series with LGBTQ characters
- Lists of LGBTQ figures in fiction and myth
