= Intersex literature =

List of written works

Intersex people and themes appear in numerous books, comics and magazines. Intersex, in humans and other animals, describes variations in sex characteristics including chromosomes, gonads, sex hormones, or genitals that, according to the UN Office of the High Commissioner for Human Rights, "do not fit typical binary notions of male or female bodies". Morgan Holmes describes common representations of intersex people as monsters or ciphers for discussions about sex and gender, while Phoebe Hart contrasts a small number of examples of well-rounded characters with the creation of "objects of ridicule".

== Fiction ==
=== Intersex representations in fiction ===
Intersex people have been portrayed in literature as monsters, murderers and medical dilemmas. Characters in award-winning literature include Cal Stephanides in the novel Middlesex by Jeffrey Eugenides and Max Walker in the novel Golden Boy by Abigail Tarttelin.

Morgan Holmes, Canadian sociologist and a former activist with the (now defunct) Intersex Society of North America, comments on constructions of intersex people as monsters or ciphers for discussions about sex and gender. Holmes describes her weariness "of writers who had been contacting me for a number of years during my intersex-activist days, trying to find out whether their proposed ‘hermaphrodite’ characters in this or that piece of fiction could do things like impregnate themselves or have sex with themselves", and how depictions of intersex people are "stalled", reifying "the proper place of traditional visions and modes of masculinity in opposition to femininity" or "beyond and outside the realm of gender altogether"; the character of Annabel/Wayne, in the Canadian novel Annabel by Kathleen Winter, provides an example of monstrous auto-impregnation, while science fiction representations of intersex may also reflect monstrous interpretations of a hermaphrodite.

Phoebe Hart describes a range of media representations, from a small number of examples of well-rounded characters such as Cal Stephanides in the novel Middlesex by Jeffrey Eugenides to the creation of "objects of ridicule".

=== List of works of intersex fiction ===
The list is organised by the author's surname.

- Icarus – K. Ancrum: Helios, the protagonist's love interest, is an intersex boy.
- Middlesex – Jeffrey Eugenides: Middlesex (2002) by Jeffrey Eugenides is a Pulitzer Prize-winning novel narrated by an intersex character who discusses the societal experience of an intersex person. The novel's interrelationship between intersex and incest gave the book a controversial reception from intersex commentators.
- The Ilario series – Mary Gentle: Mary Gentle used an intersex narrator in Ilario: The Lion's Eye and its sequel Ilario: The Stone Golem, published in 2007.
- None of the Above – I. W. Gregorio: A homecoming queen and champion hurdler finds her life turned upside-down after a diagnosis with androgen insensitivity syndrome in None of the Above by I. W. Gregorio, a young adult book published in 2015.
- All You Zombies – Robert A. Heinlein: All You Zombies is a science fiction short story by Robert A. Heinlein, adapted in 2014 in the movie Predestination.
- The Hermaphrodite – Julia Ward Howe: The Hermaphrodite is an incomplete novel by Julia Ward Howe about Laurence, an intersex character raised as a male but whose underlying gender ambiguity often creates havoc in his life. It was probably begun in the winter of 1846–47.
- Raptor – Gary Jennings: Raptor is an historical novel by Gary Jennings set in the late fifth and early sixth centuries. It purports to be the memoirs of an Ostrogoth, Thorn.
- Pantomime – Laura Lam: Laura Lam's young adult fantasy novel Pantomime and its sequel Shadowplay feature an intersex protagonist named Micah Grey.
- The Left Hand of Darkness – Ursula K. Le Guin: The Left Hand of Darkness is a multiple award-winning 1969 science fiction novel by Ursula K. Le Guin. Le Guin's introduction to the 1976 publication of the book identifies Left Hand of Darkness as a thought experiment to explore society without men or women, where individuals share the biological and emotional makeup of both genders.
- 2312 – Kim Stanley Robinson: 2312 is a science fiction novel written by Kim Stanley Robinson. It includes two lead characters, Swan Er Hong and Fitz Wahram, with intersex characteristics.
- The Ministry of Utmost Happiness – Arundhati Roy: The novel by Indian writer Arundhati Roy, published in 2017. Roy's characters run the gamut of Indian society and include an intersex woman (hijra), a rebellious architect, and her landlord who is a supervisor in the intelligence service.
- Golden Boy – Abigail Tarttelin: Abigail Tarttelin's 2013 novel Golden Boy is about an intersex teenager. The book won a 2014 Alex Award, which recognizes the book's appeal to young adult readers.
- Annabel – Kathleen Winter: Kathleen Winter's 2010 novel Annabel is a fictional account of an intersex person growing up in Labrador, Newfoundland and Labrador, Canada.

== Non-fiction ==
=== Books ===
==== Intersex Figures in Modern Japanese Literature and Art – Leslie Winston ====
Intersex Figures in Modern Japanese Literature and Art explores intersex or futanari figures in the modern period when sexologists determined rigid categories of “male” and “female,” “normal” and “pathological,” denying the existence of intersex. However, modern writers and artists produced provocative discourses defying the new sexual regime of the modern imperial state. Nonetheless, many of the old tropes and attitudes persist to this day.

==== Herculine Barbin – Herculine Barbin, Michel Foucault ====
Herculine Barbin: Being the Recently Discovered Memoirs of a Nineteenth-century French Hermaphrodite is a 1980 English-language translation of Herculine Barbin's nineteenth-century memoirs, which were originally written in French. The book contains an introduction by Michel Foucault. Foucault discovered Barbin's memoirs during his research about hermaphroditism for The History of Sexuality.

==== Interdicciones – Mauro Cabral (editor) ====
Interdicciones. Escrituras de la intersexualidad en castellano (Interdictions. Writings on intersex in Spanish) is a 2009 collection of non-fiction, fiction, and poetry edited by Mauro Cabral.

==== Intersex: Stories and Statistics from Australia – Tiffany Jones, Bonnie Hart, Morgan Carpenter, Gavi Ansara, William Leonard and Jayne Lucke (authors) ====
Intersex: Stories and Statistics from Australia is a 2016 book of statistical findings and stories from an Australian national study led by Tiffany Jones.

==== Contesting Intersex: The Dubious Diagnosis - Georgiann Davis ====
Contesting Intersex: The Dubious Diagnosis by Georgiann Davis examines the history of the U.S. intersex movement with a focus on the medicalization of intersex bodies and a contested shift in clinical language from intersex to "disorders of sex development".

==== Hermaphrodites and the Medical Invention of Sex - Alice Dreger ====
A collection of essays on intersex as a social phenomenon, living with intersex traits, and medical management. The book was published in 1998 by Harvard University Press by Alice Domurat Dreger.

==== Galileo's Middle Finger - Alice Dreger ====
Galileo's Middle Finger is a 2015 book on the ethics of medical research by bioethicist and author Alice Dreger. The book recounts Dreger's activism against surgical "correction" of intersex individuals' genitalia and the use of prenatal hormone treatments. The book also reviews research on transsexualism and the treatment of the Yanomamo people.

==== Sexing the Body – Anne Fausto-Sterling ====
Sexing the Body: Gender Politics and the Construction of Sexuality is a 2000 book by Brown University Professor of Biology and Gender Studies Anne Fausto-Sterling in which she explores the social construction of gender and the social and medical treatment of intersex people.

==== Human Rights between the Sexes – Dan Christian Ghattas ====
Human Rights between the Sexes is an analysis of the human rights of intersex people in twelve countries. It was written by Dan Christian Ghattas of IVIM (OII-Germany) and published by the Heinrich Böll Foundation in October 2013.

==== Intersex (For Lack of a Better Word) – Thea Hillman ====
Intersex author Thea Hillman's memoir Intersex (For Lack of a Better Word) was published by Manic D Press in 2008 and won a Lambda Literary Award.

==== Critical Intersex – Morgan Holmes (editor) ====
Critical Intersex is a collection of essays on intersex issues, including theoretical and empirical research. Edited by intersex professor of sociology Morgan Holmes, Critical Intersex has been described as "an important book" (Anne Fausto-Sterling), "the 'go to source' for a contemporary, international representation of intersex studies," and as making "contributions that are precise, plainly written and very illuminating... the detail is fascinating and somewhat unnerving... beautifully clear and compassionate" (Contemporary Sociology).

==== Fixing Sex – Katrina Karkazis ====
Fixing Sex: Intersex, Medical Authority, and Lived Experience by Stanford anthropologist and bioethicist Katrina Karkazis was published in 2008. Described as "thoughtful", "meticulous", and an "authoritative treatise on intersex", the book examines the perspectives of intersex people, their families, and clinicians to offer a compassionate look at the treatment of people born with atypical sex characteristics.

==== Born Both: An Intersex Life – Hida Viloria ====
An intimate memoir by Hida Viloria, a writer and intersex activist, a candid, provocative, and eye-opening perspective of life, love, and gender identity as an intact intersex person, as well as a call to action for justice for intersex people. The book was published in 2017 and is a Lambda Literary Award finalist.

Hermaphrodite Logic: A History of Intersex Liberation - Juliana Gleeson

Published by Verso Books in 2025 and written by historian Juliana Gleeson. Hermaphrodite Logic details the intersex liberation movement which emerged in the 1990s, focused on the West Coast of the USA.

=== Journals ===
==== Hermaphrodites with Attitude ====
The former Intersex Society of North America published the journal Hermaphrodites with Attitude between 1994 and 2005.

=== Poetry ===
==== Dear Herculine – Aaron Apps ====
A 2015 hybrid/poetry collection by Aaron Apps won the 2014 Sawtooth Poetry Prize. The book recalls and interacts with portions of the memoirs of 19th Century French hermaphrodite Herculine Barbin.

==== Intersex: A Memoir - Aaron Apps ====
A 2015 poetry collection and memoir by Aaron Apps explores gender and what happens when a body is normalized. A section of the book, Barbecue Catharsis, was listed as a notable essay in the 2014 edition of The Best American Essays.

=== Comics ===
==== I.S. ====
The Japanese manga series I.S., first published in 2003, features intersex characters and how they deal with intersex-related issues and influence the lives of people around them. It was complimented by intersexinitiative.org as "groundbreaking" and "probably the world's first serial comics based on the real lives of intersex people".

==== Demon Knights ====
In 2012, the character Shining Knight was revealed as DC Comics's first intersex character in Demon Knights #14.

== See also ==
- Intersex human rights reports
- Films about intersex
- Television works about intersex
- Intersex characters in fiction
