= Intersex characters in fiction =

Intersex people are born with sex characteristics, such as genitals, gonads and chromosome patterns, "that do not fit typical binary notions of male or female bodies". Literary descriptions may use older or different language for intersex traits, including describing intersex people as hermaphrodites, neither wholly male or female, or a combination of male and female. This page examines intersex characters in fictional works as a whole, focusing on characters and tropes over time.

For more information about fictional characters in other parts of the LGBTQ community, see the corresponding pages about asexual, pansexual, non-binary, lesbian, and gay characters in fiction.

== Intersex characters by medium ==
=== Television ===
The MTV series Faking It marked the first intersex series regular in a TV show, Lauren Cooper, and also the first intersex character played by an intersex person, Raven. MTV worked with intersex civil society organization interACT on Faking It; the program was praised for creating a groundbreaking character. A Freaks and Geeks story has also been credited as commendable.

Stevonnie, a fusion of both Steven and Connie, has a gender which is difficult to describe, Series creator Rebecca Sugar describes it as the "living relationship between Steven and Connie." Stevonnie is commonly referred to with gender neutral pronouns (such as the singular they), while male and female characters seem to be physically attracted to Stevonnie.

=== Anime and Manga ===
Another prominent intersex character is Luca Esposito in Astra Lost in Space, the manga and anime of the same name. He is an artist and talented engineer on board the Astra, who was raised as and mostly identifies as a boy, and comes out as intersex halfway through the story, in the episode "Secret," not considering himself a man or a woman. He was described by Michele Liu of Anime News Network as "unique" since Luca is a main character which is born intersex rather than "altered by sci-fi space diseases or external influence," with Liu also describing Luca as bisexual.

While there were intersex characters like Ryo Asuka in Devilman Crybaby and Izana Shinatose in Knights of Sidonia, there are three other series with notable characters. They are Crimvael "Crim" in the controversial series Interspecies Reviewers, Iena Madaraba in Seton Academy: Join the Pack!, Ruby Moon in Cardcaptor Sakura. Crim is a well-endowed intersex angel with a broken halo, that has male and female genitalia, as noted throughout the series. Despite his feminine appearance, he chooses to identify as male upon meeting Stunk & Zel in the first episode, to avoid them trying anything perverted on him. As for Iena, also known as Yena, she is a spotted hyena with a penis and is confused about her true gender & sexuality. Although she later finds out that she is biologically female, she still allows others to refer to her with either gender pronoun in episodes such as "The Wild Habits of a Troubled Animal."

Comics have their own intersex characters as well. For instance, Comet, and Comet later began relationship with Blithe, since she loved both their forms (revealing that Blithe is bisexual). and Rebis are intersex. Additionally Richard Plantagenet, later Richard III of England in Requiem of the Rose King and Ystina, the Shining Knight in Demon Knights are as well.

=== Literature ===
There are various intersex characters in literature. This includes Cornelius Brunner in The Final Programme Ilario in Ilario, A Story of the First History, and Kirsten Lattimer in None of the Above., Bel Thorne in the Vorkosigan Saga and Max Walker in Golden Boy.

Some award-winning books include Max Walker in the novel Golden Boy by Abigail Tarttelin and Anjum in the novel The Ministry of Utmost Happiness by Arundhati Roy.

=== Cinema ===
In film, the character Rebeca Duarte in the movie Both was created by an intersex woman, Lisett Barcellos. There are other intersex characters in film, such as Adela in My Dearest Senorita, Ponyboi in Ponyboi, Rebeca Duarte in Both, Alex Kraken in XXY, and Spork in Spork. The film Conclave reveals that a prominent character is intersex near the end.

== Tropes in intersex representation ==
Intersex people have been portrayed in literature, television and film as monsters, murderers and medical dilemmas. Many of these tropes are quite old, and seen in multiple cultures. For example, a trope that intersex individuals are sexual predators who prey on unsuspecting young women, has been in use for hundreds of years.

Stigmatizing tropes can be seen in award-winning media, such as Cal Stephanides in the novel Middlesex by Jeffrey Eugenides. Intersex studies scholars have discussed how the novel relies heavily on tropes, portraying Cal as monstrous.

Morgan Holmes, Canadian sociologist and a former activist with the (now defunct) Intersex Society of North America, comments on constructions of intersex people as monsters or ciphers for discussions about sex and gender. Holmes describes her weariness "of writers who had contacted me for a number of years during my intersex-activist days, trying to determine if their proposed ‘hermaphrodites’ could do things like impregnate or have sex with themselves", and how depictions of intersex people are "stalled", reifying "the proper place of traditional visions and modes of masculinity in opposition to femininity" or "beyond and outside the realm of gender altogether"; the character of Annabel/Wayne, in the Canadian novel Annabel by Kathleen Winter, provides an example of monstrous auto-impregnation.

An intersex murderer plot twist trope has been repeated in the TV programs Nip/Tuck (Quentin Costa), Passions (Vincent Clarkson) and Janet King. This has been criticized as hackneyed and offensive, characterizing intersex people as deceitful.

Examples of the medical dilemmas trope include the 2010 Childrens Hospital episode "Show Me on Montana", the 2012 Emily Owens, M.D. episode "Emily and... the Question of Faith", a 2009 episode of House entitled, "The Softer Side", and Masters of Sex episode 3 in season 2, "Fight".

== See also ==
- Films about intersex
- Timeline of intersex history
- Literature about intersex
- Television works about intersex
- List of intersex people
- List of fictional polyamorous characters
- List of animated series with LGBT characters
- Lists of LGBT figures in fiction and myth
