= Intersex UK =

Organization

- Type: NGO
- Purpose: Intersex human rights
- Region served: United Kingdom, Ireland
- Website: intersexuk.org

Intersex UK is an organisation by and for intersex people (those born with differences of sex development or variations of sex anatomy) in the United Kingdom and Ireland. Intersex UK works to protect the bodily autonomy and civil rights of intersex children, adolescents, and their families through government lobbying and educational outreach.

== Mission ==
Intersex UK's mission is to end unnecessary surgeries and normalizing hormonal regimens on intersex infants and adolescents, promote bodily autonomy, and lobby for increased public education and access to identification documents with preferred gender markers.

The organisation has also published a list of UK specific legislative demands, including calling for the Equality Act 2010 to extend protection to people who do not identify as male or female, calling for the abolishment of the Gender Recognition Panel, and moving to a model of gender self-determination.

== Advocacy ==
=== Physical integrity and bodily autonomy ===
Co-founder Holly Greenberry-Pullen spoke at the "first United Nations Human Rights Council side event on intersex issues" in March 2014, alongside Mauro Cabral and representatives of Organisation Intersex International Australia and Zwischengeschlecht.

Greenberry-Pullen was quoted in a feature in The Independent stating: “We are at a tipping point ... Most intelligent human beings would be completely surprised and utterly dismayed at the civil inequality and human rights abuses that healthy intersex children and young adults are facing.” Greenberry-Pullen also appeared with Abigail Tarttelin on BBC Radio 4 discussing challenges facing the intersex community as well as Tarttelin's novel, Golden Boy.

In 2025 Greenberry-Pullen spoke to The Guardian about her experience undergoing various surgeries as an intersex teenager, and called for a ban on unnecessary surgeries on intersex people in the UK. She also criticised the For Women Scotland Ltd v The Scottish Ministers Supreme Court ruling, calling it flawed, due to the court only using binary sex when considering their decision.

=== Identification documents ===
Greenberry-Pullen notes that intersex people in the United Kingdom are not able to change the gender shown on identification documents and thus do not have the right to marriage or civil partnerships, however this does not affect all intersex people. She has pushed for the government to make correcting birth certificates easier, and suggested that the Gender Recognition Act should be renamed to the “Gender and Intersex Recognition Act”.

=== Media work ===
The organisation also undertakes media work to promote human rights.

== See also ==
- Dawn Vago (co-founder of Intersex UK)
- Intersex human rights
- Intersex rights in the United Kingdom
- Intersex rights by country
