= Being Impossible =

2018 Venezuelan drama film

- Directed by: Patricia Ortega
- Written by: Patricia Ortega, Enmanuel Chávez
- Starring: Lucía Bedoya; María Elena Duque; Belkis Alvillares
- Cinematography: Mateo Guzmán
- Edited by: Mauricio Vergara
- Music by: Álvaro Morales
- Distributed by: Media Luna
- Release date: 20 October 2018 (Valladolid International Film Festival)
- Running time: 97 minutes
- Countries: Venezuela; Colombia
- Language: Spanish

Being Impossible (Spanish: Yo, imposible) (Note: Which literally translates to English as I, Impossible or Impossible Me) is a 2018 drama film co-written and directed by Patricia Ortega. It features an intersex main character played by Colombian actress Lucía Bedoya, who has been widely praised for her performance.

The film has been shown internationally at many festivals, and won several awards, including six at the Venezuelan Film Festival. Despite suffering many production setbacks due to the Crisis in Venezuela, the film was released in various countries between 2018 and 2020. The film has been critically reviewed, with a mixed response, and analyzed in depth by film and intersex issue writers. It was selected as the Venezuelan entry for the Best International Feature Film at the 92nd Academy Awards, but it was not nominated.

== Synopsis ==
Ariel (Lucía Bedoya) is a 20-year-old woman who works as a seamstress in a clothing factory, though feels like she does not fit in. She has sex with her boyfriend, Carlos (Santiago Osuna), for the first time, but only feels intense pain. She mentions this to her mother, Dolores (María Elena Duque), who is ill with cancer. Though she encourages Ariel to keep trying so she can fulfil the role of a woman in their patriarchal society, she does mention that Ariel can visit her childhood doctor, Clemencia (Adyane Gonzalez). At work, Ariel feels more isolated as the other women, even her closest friend (Virginia Urdaneta), show their true colors and try to pry into everybody else's business. Ariel visits Clemencia several times, first being diagnosed with vaginal stenosis and prescribed medical dildos. Through visits with her mother and Clemencia, Ariel becomes more suspicious about what she is not being told, and finds herself in stress just as a new woman, Ana (Belkis Alvillares), joins the factory; Ariel is intrigued by Ana.

With Ariel's pain worsening, Clemencia reveals to Ariel that she was born intersex and was submitted to a series of surgeries as a child to conform to a female body, which upsets her. She begins a clandestine relationship with Ana at the factory, though frequently tries to deny her feelings. Her nosy friend soon finds out and Ariel becomes the subject of homophobia, further conflicting her feelings about her gender identity and sexuality. The friend starts a fight with them at the factory that results in Ariel being fired. The narrative is intercut with testimonials from intersex people.

== Production ==
=== Conception and writing ===
This movie came in the middle of a storm [...] In the same way that Ariel begins a new life at the end of the story, I also began to be someone else. Sometimes the cinema becomes a projection of our lives.

— Patricia Ortega

Ortega has said that the idea for the film, her second feature, came from societally-imposed expectations of her role and her body as a woman. She wanted to explore the life of an intersex person, and also tackle issues that resonate with people who have had to stand up to society and demand their own bodily autonomy or freedom of sexuality. After meeting "the first" intersex girl in Venezuela, Ortega realised that the topic was never discussed and, if anything, was studied as a scientific curiosity. Wanting to learn the view of intersex in the rest of the world, Ortega spoke to different international groups, hearing stories that she used to help write the film. The main character's name, Ariel, was chosen because it is both a feminine and masculine name in Spanish.

Ortega has also spoken of how she was developing the film during a time of crisis; in her own life, her mother had just been diagnosed with cancer and she was getting a divorce. She has explained that she found writing Ariel to be therapeutic, and that the character "became [her] counselor [and] helped [her] face [her] transformation". The film is also said to be a different output to Ortega's past work, the director herself saying that it "is nothing like what [she] had done before, it marks the beginning of a more personal and intimate formal search [with] changes from an aesthetic, narrative and personal point of view". The film's original music was scored by Álvaro Morales.

=== Funding and filming ===
A crowdfunding video campaign for the production

The film was partially funded by a Venezuelan Centro Nacional Autónomo de Cinematografía grant (one of the last films to receive such), and qualified for funding from Colombia because of its Colombian-minority cast and crew. In 2015, the producers had been awarded some funding from the Meeting of Producers at the Cartagena Film Festival. Despite this, they still had to use crowdfunding to complete the film. As part of the crowdfunding, production company Mandragora Films released promotional videos about the film in 2017. In 2018, it won Women in Film LA's Film Finishing Fund, which was used to complete the film; it only required color correction at the time of this award.

The film was shot on a RED Scarlet 4K, in the town of La Trampa, Mérida and Caracas, in 2016. Lead actress Lucía Bedoya was studying drama at the University of Valle during the production. The production had some problems, mostly from the Crisis in Venezuela; rampant hyperinflation quickly used up their budget, and scenes had to filmed around the constant street protests in the nation.

=== Release ===
The film trailer for Yo, imposible

Being Impossible premiered at the Valladolid International Film Festival, Spain, in October 2018. Its US release was at South by Southwest in 2019; when interviewed by the festival about going there, Ortega revealed that she was told of the film's selection on the day that Juan Guaidó was announced acting President of Venezuela at the start of the Venezuelan presidential crisis, throwing her country and her work into turmoil.

The film was delayed in its commercial release in Venezuela, because of the electricity crisis at the time it was intended to premiere; it was planned to be shown at the end of 2019 in three cinemas across the country, though Ortega said at the time of the announcement that before that could happen she would need to print theatrical posters for the film herself. The official film trailer was released in February 2019, though the first teaser trailer had been published in 2017.

Ortega also expressed concern about finances for marketing the film through its submission to the Academy Awards, but said that the surprise selection was "like being given a foot that lets you continue working." The film had been shown in Venezuela in June 2019, when it was screened at the 15th Venezuelan Film Festival between 18 and 23 June. Here it won the Best Director, Best Actress, Best Supporting Actress, Best Screenplay, Best Music, and Best Casting awards. The late 2019 Venezuelan release did not happen, and it was released in the country on 17 January 2020. In 2020 it was also made available in the United States on DirecTV and HBO streaming channels; it was going to have a theatrical release at HOME in Manchester in March 2020, but this was canceled due to the 2020 COVID-19 pandemic.

== Analysis ==
In terms of intersex and film studies, Raphaël Jullien compared Being Impossible to the Argentinian film XXY, also about an intersex youth, saying that XXY's power lies in the suspense of not knowing Alex's troubles, whereas Being Impossible "annihilates any suspense" by placing testimonies from people of non-conforming gender identity at the start of the film. Jullien added that, since the scene where Ariel meets this group is so powerful and moving, the cold open would have been better used as an epilogue. Carlos Loureda also commented on the testimonies, but instead suggests that they merely do not add anything to the film, saying they are "undoubtedly interesting" but that the fictional narrative is strong enough to convey the truth without them. Writers for the Gaze film festival looked at the film both in terms of and beyond the intersex experience, calling it a "thought-provoking inquiry into the nature of how we as human beings allow our physical beings to determine our mental and spiritual identities", while Vivian Belloto described a moment when Ariel destroys a medical dildo she has been prescribed treatment with as showing "the non-acceptance of the culture of penetration and false normalization of bodies".

Belloto's analysis focuses on the presentation of bodies in the film. She discussed its juxtaposition of mannequin forms with the bodies of the main characters, noting how Ortega "constantly uses mannequins as a symbolic form of body standardization", and also talks about the cinematography, mentioning shots blurring characters or showing them through mirrors, which she describes as "a call for self-awareness" and says is used "to emphasize the particularities of each body present". At the start of the film, images of bodies are relegated to the edges of the screen to deliberately obscure expectations of narrative, which Belloto says also alerts the audience to ignorance of one's body. The character Ariel also works at a clothing factory, showing her confinement within a place full of things used to define and conceal bodies; it is also a social space entirely full of women. In the factory, Belloto writes that the choice of shot focusing on the eyes when Ariel and a new worker steal glances at each other shows the construct barring homosexuality in society and specifically in a single-sex space; looking at the eyes, especially when the film has otherwise shown bodies, represents the restriction to looking and not touching, as well as cropping only to the eyes also allowing another shot, of the eyes of a different employee who sees the glances, to be seamlessly shown though alternatively being a glace that is judgmental of homosexuality.

Beatrice Loayza writes about the aesthetics of the film. She noted the award-winning music, describing how the "droning background score [...] overwhelms the senses even in moments of quiet reflection", and so how, beyond image and story, the music of the film also contributes to its theme of a lack of control. She then discusses how the color palette used the film is of natural, muted, tones, being used as an aid to highlight the impoverished area of Venezuela where it is set without outright addressing the nation's crisis, as well as making spots of color, often red, more meaningful, such as the blood shed by Ariel after her first experience of sex or bright red lipstick on mirrors used to write homophobic messages. The cinematic style is discussed by Pablo Gamba, who wrote that it fit the Gothic style that Ortega is known for; unlike her other films, which Gamba said often show Maracaibo in ruins, Being Impossible explores the Gothic by successfully creating the idea of "the monster" and its ever-changing nature. Michele Faggi also commented on the cinematic style, but instead notes the recurring use of reflections. Faggi writes that "Ortega fragments the vision from the beginning" and forces a questioning of Ariel's true identity by her "insistent" use of reflections and mirrors to look at Ariel, as well as editing techniques that allow for various interpretations in terms of Gaze – of these, Faggi particularly notes the use of "the LCD screen of a turned-on video camera" for framing the real testimonies of intersex people, a self-reflective acknowledgement of always being viewed. Paolo Kagaoan also noted the mirror shots, but wrote that they were "cliche [and only] palatable because of Bedoya's performance".

Loayza commented on the social context of the film's production as a product of a Venezuela that is ignoring gay rights laws, and how important it therefore is that it did not end tragically (as could be expected normally), which is especially poignant in a film set in a place where LGBT+ people are not talked about. Jullien further opined that the film shows a critique of life in contemporary Venezuela, noting the traditional gender roles and binary enforced by characters.

== Reception ==
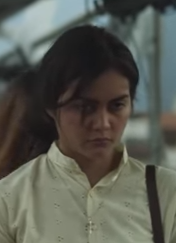
Lucía Bedoya as Ariel; she was praised for her performance.

Critics were divided on the film, but generally positive. Beatrice Loayza said that it has "an empowering and incredibly progressive conclusion". However, Raquel Stecher believes that it is "a heavy-handed story" and that audiences "will be overwhelmed by the subject matter"; Pablo Gamba similarly said that the film is "clearly 'NGO cinema'", but thought that its focus was clear. Scott Braid highly praised many aspects of the film, including the story it tells and the "incredible performance of smouldering intensity" that Bedoya gives, as well as its cinematography and direction. Kagaoan also complimented Bedoya's performance, but overall found the film to be too ambitious, writing that it falls short in some of the areas it chooses to focus on, particularly its character relationships.

A missing connection to its characters was also noted by Chris dos Santos, who said that the film is "raw and confronting [with] very graphic sex scenes [that] lack emotional resonance". He found that "while Ariel's discovery is highly emotional and life-changing, you never feel that connected to her story [and] where the film thrives is in the support group scenes"; he notes that though the film is not that strong in its narrative, it "should be celebrated" for covering discussions of intersex discrimination. The Galway Film Fleadh also complimented that "there isn't a lot of intersex representation on film and Patricia Ortega delivers a worthy film for the canon".

Raphaël Jullien wrote about how meticulous Ortega's articulation of shots and use of symbolism are, despite some shortcomings in composition; he concluded that though they set off on the wrong foot, it is "a very beautiful film on gender identity" and is pleased with its optimistic ending. Carlos Loureda praised the film and Bedoya strongly, calling it "one of the most beautiful films of the year" and Bedoya "an actress who overflows the big screen".

The film has won several Audience Awards at festivals, which Ortega says she appreciates because it shows that the "difficult" subject is accepted much more easily in other parts of the world to Venezuela.

=== Accolades ===
The film was part of the 2019 South by Southwest Official Selection, with its US release on 9 March 2019, where it was nominated for the Gamechanger Award.

It has also been part of the official selection at other festivals, including the 2018 Havana Film Festival, where it was nominated for the Unete Award, getting Special Recognition; 2019 Maryland Film Festival; 2019 Guadalajara International Film Festival; 2019 Toronto International Film Festival; and at the 2018 Valladolid International Film Festival, where it won the Rainbow Spike award. In 2019, it won the Best Construction of a Female Character award at Mexico's Femme Revolution Film Fest, the Best Mix Feature Audience Award presented by Out TV at the Amsterdam LGBTI Film Festival, and the Audience Award at the Reflections of Spanish and Latin American Cinema Festival in Villeurbanne.

In September 2019, the film was chosen as Venezuela's selection to be nominated for the Academy Award for Best International Feature Film.

Year	Event	Award	Recipients	Result	Ref.
2018	Havana Film Festival	Únete Award	Being Impossible	Special Recognition	
2018	Valladolid International Film Festival	Rainbow Spike Award	Being Impossible	Won	
2019	Femme Revolution Film Fest	Best Construction of a Female Character	Patricia Ortega	Won	
2019	Amsterdam LGBTI Film Festival	Audience Award	Being Impossible	Won	
2019	Reflections of Spanish and Latin American Cinema Festival	Audience Award	Being Impossible	Won	
2019	South by Southwest	Gamechanger Award	Patricia Ortega	Nominated	
2019	Havana Film Festival	Maguey Award	Being Impossible	Won	
2019	Venezuelan Film Festival	Best Director	Patricia Ortega	Won	
2019	Venezuelan Film Festival	Best Actress	Lucía Bedoya	Won	
2019	Venezuelan Film Festival	Best Supporting Actress	María Elena Duque	Won	
2019	Venezuelan Film Festival	Best Screenplay	Patricia Ortega, Enmanuel Chávez	Won	
2019	Venezuelan Film Festival	Best Music	Álvaro Morales	Won	
2019	Venezuelan Film Festival	Best Casting	Luis Castillo, Carolina Riveros	Won	
2019	Houston International LGBTQ Film Festival	Best Script	Patricia Ortega, Enmanuel Chávez	Won	
2019	XII International LGBTI Film Festival by Movilh	Best Film	Being Impossible	Won	
2019	Santo Domingo OutFest	Outstanding Performance	Lucía Bedoya	Won	
2019	Taipei Film Festival	International New Talent Competition - Grand Prize	Patricia Ortega	Nominated	
2020	Academy Awards	Best International Feature Film	Being Impossible	Not nominated (Note: Submitted by the CNAC, not included in the December shortlist by the Academy.)	
2020	Platino Awards	Best Director	Patricia Ortega	Nominated	

== See also ==
- XXY – Argentinian film about intersex youth
- Both – Peruvian film about intersex issues
- Films about intersex
- List of submissions to the 92nd Academy Awards for Best International Feature Film
- List of Venezuelan submissions for the Academy Award for Best International Feature Film
