= Midnight Rose =

Midnight Rose was a name taken by a group of United Kingdom science fiction and fantasy writers for a series of shared world anthologies published by the Penguin Books imprint Roc. The group's "core members" were Alex Stewart, Roz Kaveney, Neil Gaiman and Mary Gentle. Contributors to individual anthologies included Marcus Rowland, Storm Constantine, Kim Newman, Charles Stross, Stephen Baxter, Colin Greenland, Graham Higgins, Paul Cornell and David Langford.

== Anthologies ==
=== Temps ===
Credited on the cover as "devised by" Alex Stewart and Neil Gaiman. This was a spoofsuperhero shared universe set in a world where the United Kingdom and European Union demand registry of superhuman talents, whereupon the Talented are expected to be permanently "on call" as part-time superheroes, in exchange for a stipend. The popular perception of the British Civil Service is played up, with registering as a "Temp" being strangely similar to applying for Jobseeker's Allowance or other benefits. Consisted ofTemps (1991) and EuroTemps (1992).

=== The Weerde ===
A shared universe credited as "devised by" Neil Gaiman, Mary Gentle and Roz Kaveney. Here, shapeshifters have lived secretly alongside humanity for millennia. Most conceal themselves, but their presence has inspired human legends of supernatural monsters such as werewolves. Consisted of The Weerde Book One (1992) and The Weerde Book Two: Book of the Ancients (1993). The first volume had a framing device narrative cowritten by Gaiman and Kaveney.

=== Villains! ===
Villains!! (1992), billed as "created by" Gaiman and Mary Gentle but actually edited by Gentle and Roz Kaveney. This mocked the conventionss of heroic fantasy. Like Gentle's later novel Grunts!, this took the point of view of antagonist archetypes.

== Reprinted stories ==
Several of the stories from these anthologies have subsequently appeared in other collections, or have been put online by their authors.

- Storm Constantine: "The College Spirit" (Temps), "A Change of Season", reprinted in her collection Mytholoumina. "The Deliveress" ("Villains!") in her collections The Oracle Lips and Mythanimus. "The Law of Being" (Euro Temps) collected in Mythangelus.
- Paul Corne: "Sunflower Pump" (The Weerde Book One) collected in the collection A Better Way to Die: The Collected Short Stories.
- Mary Gentle: "Cartomancy" "Cartomancy: Conclusion" (Villains!), "What God Abandoned" (The Weerde Book One), reprinted in her collection Cartomancy)
- Roz Kaveney: "A Lonely Impulse" (Temps), "A Wolf To Man" (The Weerde Book One), "Bellringers' Overtime" (Villains!), "Totally Trashed" (EuroTemps), "Ignorance of Perfect Reason" (The Weerde Book Two), reprinted online.
- David Langford: "Leaks" (Temps), "The Arts of the Enemy" (Villains!), "If Looks Could Kill" (EuroTemps), "The Lions in the Desert" (The Weerde Book Two), repreinted online.
- Marcus Rowland: "Frog Day Afternoon" (Temps), "Playing Safe" (EuroTemps), "The Missing Martian" (The Weerde Book Two), reprinted online.
- Charles Stross: "Examination Night" (Villains!), "Ancient of Days" (The Weerde Book One), "Red, Hot and Dark" (The Weerde Book Two), reprinted online.
