= Orthe =

Orthe may refer to:

- Orthe (Thessaly), a town of Perrhaebia in ancient Thessaly
- Orthe (series), a series of science fiction novels by British writer Mary Gentle
- Pays d'Orthe, a region in France
- Orthe (river), a river in France
- Canton of Orthe et Arrigans, an administrative division of the Landes department, southwestern France
