= Lucía Bedoya =

Colombian actress and model

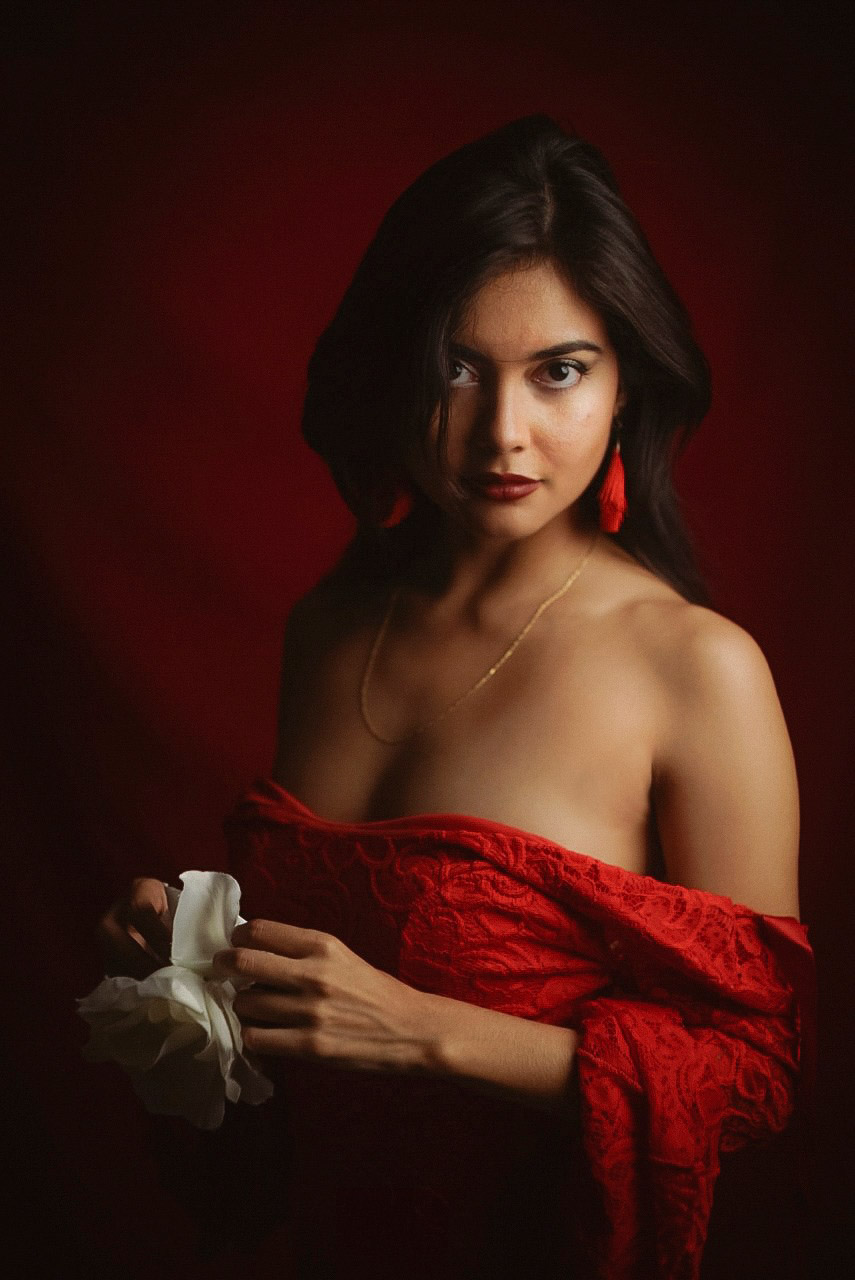
- Bedoya in her flamenco dress in 2019
- Born: Cali, Colombia
- Education: University of Valle
- Occupations: Actress; Model
- Years active: 2010-present
- Notable work: Being Impossible
- Website: luciabedoya.co

Lucía Bedoya is a Colombian stage and screen actress and model.

== Career beginnings ==
Bedoya attended the University of Valle, where she studied dramatic arts, from 2012. She was still a student whilst filming Being Impossible in 2018. Before drama, she studied several other subjects, including psychology, but clicked immediately with drama. In 2015 she traveled to the United States to work on Broadway and study at a musical theatre workshop led by Luis Salgado. She received a scholarship for this, and later also got one to study Chinese opera in Shanghai, in 2016. She was awarded the Chinese scholarship through a society for Asian theatre that met at the University of Valle; she was asked to be a translator for the delegates at the meeting, coming to the notice of various professors on the scholarship board.

=== Modeling ===
Since before 2015, Bedoya has been modelling. In 2016 she was profiled and interviewed by Cali TV station Canal 2, as a model and drama student, where she said she was mostly a freelance model, a job she didn't expect, and was "hard to define" because her identity is based on many things.

== Acting ==
Bedoya has said that she feels fortunate that the arts in Latin America are much more accepting of young people, believing that international industries are predominantly full of older people with much classical experience, and thinks performing is a less exclusive, regular profession in Latin America. She also said that for her to act in Latin America wouldn't require qualifications like many actors in Europe or Asia, but she chose to study in order to open up her experiences.

In 2010, she played the main character in the short film Las razones de Sofía by Andrés Jiménez Soto.

In 2017, Bedoya and other Valle students performed at a university theatre festival in Turkey, with organizers saying their production was the best of the festival.

Her first feature film was the 2018 Being Impossible, in which she played the lead role of Ariel, a young woman who discovers she was born intersex. She has said that it was "a dream" to play the character, and saying that "rather than acting based on the character's sexual difference, I acted based on what makes each of us different, and how at some point in our lives we have all felt different". She has been widely commended for her performance in the film: Scott Braid highly praised the "incredible performance of smouldering intensity" that she gives, Paolo Kagaoan criticized aspects of the film but also compliments Bedoya's performance, saying that her talent makes cliché shots "palatable", with Carlos Loureda also giving a strong review, calling her "an actress who overflows the big screen". She won the Best Actress award at the 2019 Venezuelan Film Festival.
