= Dawn Vago =

Singer and intersex activist (born 1980)

Dawn Vago (born September 1980) is a singer, cruise director, and co-founder of Intersex UK. She is an intersex woman with complete androgen insensitivity syndrome (CAIS). She lives in Warrington, England with her husband and owns two nail salons.

== Career ==
Vago is a co-founder and co-director Intersex UK, an intersex organization founded in 2011 to combat stigma around intersex variations and promote protection and equality for intersex people. In 2018, Vago and her fellow Intersex UK co-director Holly Greenberry were key speakers at the third Annual Brighton Trans, Non-Binary and Intersex Conference. In 2018 Vago was scheduled to be the designated speaker for intersex NGO coalition to testify to the United Nations Committee on the Elimination of Discrimination against Women. However, she fell and sustained several injuries, so someone else was designated to take her place.

Vago also works as a singer and part time cruise director. She works on the event team of Vacaya, an LGBTQ+ vacation company. In 2019, Vago opened a nail salon in Great Sankey called The Pink Room. The salon won the Best Nails of 2022 in Warrington Guardian's Best of 2022 competition. She won 23rd best nails in the UK in another competition that year. She opened a second nail salon in Lymm above her husband's champagne bar called the Vago Champagne and Beauty Lounge.

== Biography ==
Due to her CAIS, Vago was born with female external genitalia, but had internal testes and no internal female reproductive organs. Although doctors advised her parents not to tell her, they told Vago that she was intersex when she was five years old. At age eight, her testes were removed. Her parents were told the operation was needed to prevent her from developing cancer and that she would not survive puberty without the gonadectomy, though this was incorrect. She started taking synthetic hormones when she was 11 years old. The treatment was mismanaged, and she developed osteoporosis and broke 11 bones by the time she was in her twenties.

Vago started singing when she was 14, but had to stop for a while since she developed nodes on her vocal cords which were removed with laser surgery. During the 18 month recovery period, she studied how to do hair and nails.

Also when she was 14, she told her doctor she had a crush on a boy. The doctor looked to her colleague, then Vago was brought to another room and had vaginal dilation performed on her. They told her it would need to be done regularly since she had a shallow vagina. Vago describes the impact of the experience saying, "This affected me greatly - emotionally and intimately. It wasn’t something I wanted to have done to me at the age of 14." Medical professionals would tell her parents that "No man will ever love her" and doctors told them to direct her towards a busy career so she would be too preoccupied to have a family.

Her family lacked support since they were told that there was no one else in the UK with her condition and no support groups. Vago always saw herself as woman, but had trouble accepting herself, saying that "when I first read my file and saw my diagnosis, my world completely exploded." She found a support group at the age of 22. She was happy to the group and angered that she was isolated for years up until that point instead of being told that there was support available.

Vago met her husband Imre in Gibraltar during her first cruise ship performance as a lead female vocalist. They traveled the world together and Imre proposed to her in Ho Chi Minh City. They moved to Warrington in 2013. Vago was approved to adopt a child in 2016, and the couple adopted a son in 2017.
