= Intersex representation in film =

Film about the intersex experience

Intersex, in humans and other animals, describes variations in sex characteristics including chromosomes, gonads, sex hormones, or genitals that, according to the UN Office of the High Commissioner for Human Rights, "do not fit typical binary notions of male or female bodies". Intersex is a part of nature and that is reflected in some representations of intersex in film and other media.

== Documentary films about intersex ==
=== Hermaphrodites Speak! ===
Hermaphrodites Speak! (1997) is a 30-minute documentary film from the United States in which several intersex people at the first retreat of the Intersex Society of North America discuss their lives and the medical treatment and parenting they received.

=== XXXY ===
In 2000, Porter Gale, Masters in Documentary Film and Video from Stanford University, and Laleh Soomekh, produced XXXY, a documentary revealing intersex individuals' and medical professional's opinions on the surgical procedures done on them, while providing a medical professional's opinion as well. The film clearly shows the dissatisfaction and the painful repercussions for the children who went through sex reassignment surgeries.

=== One in 2000 ===
One in 2000 (2006) produced by Ajae Clearway features intersex individuals and their experiences with surgeries, and advocates for informed consent.

=== Orchids, My Intersex Adventure ===
Australian documentary filmmaker Phoebe Hart directed the 2010 autobiographical documentary Orchids, My Intersex Adventure of her personal experience as an intersex person. It explores the various social scenarios faced by many intersex individuals.

=== Intersexion ===
Grant Lahood's 2012 documentary Intersexion follows Mani Bruce Mitchell of Intersex Trust Aotearoa New Zealand (ITANZ) as they visit intersex people in America, Ireland, Germany, South Africa and Australia. It received the Best Feature Documentary award at the Documentary Edge Festival. The film was directed by Grant Lahood.

=== Sidney & Friends ===
(2018) When his family tries to kill him, Sidney, who is intersex, flees to Nairobi where he meets a group of transgender friends. Together, they fight discrimination and discover life, love and self-worth.

=== No Box for Me: An Intersex Story (Ni d'Eve, ni d'Adam: une histoire intersexe) ===
No Box for Me: An Intersex Story (2018) is a poignant documentary that explores the lives of intersex individuals, focusing on their struggles with identity, societal expectations, and medical interventions. The film follows the personal journeys of two young intersex people, Deborah and M, offering an intimate look at how they navigate a world that often demands they fit into predefined gender categories.

=== The General Was Female? ===
The General Was Female? is a 2019 film about American Revolutionary War General Casimir Pulaski which suggests that he may have been intersex.

=== She's Not a Boy ===
Robert Tokanel and Yuhong Pang directed this 2019 documentary film about the life of Tatenda Ngwaru, an intersex woman who immigrated from Zimbabwe to the United States. It chronicles the joys and challenges she faces in asylum status, relationship with family, medical care, identity, and the LGBTQIA community.

=== Stories of Intersex and Faith ===
The result of scholarship and interviews about the theology, biology, and personal lives of intersex people, this documentary provides a lens into the diversity of intersex people's experiences and how intersex identity intersects with different contexts.

=== Every Body ===
This 2023 piece focuses on three individuals who overcame shame, secrecy, and unauthorized surgery throughout their childhoods to enjoy successful adulthoods, choosing to ignore medical advice to conceal their bodies and coming out as who they truly were.

=== Choosing, cutting, silencing ===
A 2024 documentary from The Netherlands (original Dutch title: Kiezen, snijden, zwijgen). The film closely follows Marieke and Sharan, both intersex. When they meet they discover they have the same childhood experiences: doctor visits, surgeries with vague explanations and the advice to stay silent. Together, they break that silence and investigate their medical histories. Their story sheds light on imposed secrecy and medicalisation of intersex people.

== Fiction films about intersex ==
=== Ponyboi ===
Ponyboi is a USC Graduate thesis film written and co-directed by River Gallo. It follows a young intersex runaway in New Jersey, looking for love

After running away from home, Ponyboi works at Bubble-Land Laundromat, a grungy 24-hour establishment on the wrong side of town. To make ends meet he hustles as a sex-worker within the laundromat. He works with Vinny (his manager and pimp) and Angel (Vinny's girlfriend).

Ponyboi's life changes on a lonely Valentine's day night, when a debonaire cowboy whom he's dreamed about visits him in the laundromat. Through this encounter with the man of his dreams, Ponyboi discovers that perhaps he is worthy of breaking free from his past and leaving his dead-end life behind.

=== Tintomara ===
Tintomara, a 1970 Swedish-Danish drama film. It is based on the novel Drottningens juvelsmycke by Jonas Love Almqvist and features one of Swedish literature's most enduringly popular characters, the eponymous androgyne Tintomara.

=== The Mystery of Alexina ===
The Mystery of Alexina, a 1985 French film based on the story of Herculine Barbin.

=== XXY ===
The 2007 Argentine film XXY centres around a young intersex person assisted in presenting as a girl by medication. The film deals with discrimination, sexuality and gender identity.

=== Both ===
A 2005 US/Peruvian film in English, Both by filmmaker Lisset Barcellos, won an audience award at the 28th Créteil International Women's Film Festival. The movie is unusual for being a film about an intersex issue directed by an intersex person.

=== Spork ===
Spork, a 2011 musical comedy, written and directed by J.B. Ghuman Jr. in which a frizzy-haired, pink-cheeked outcast named Spork tries to navigate her way through junior high.

=== Predestination ===
Predestination, a 2014 Australian science fiction thriller film, directed and written by Michael and Peter Spierig. The film is based on the Robert A. Heinlein short story "All You Zombies".

=== Being Impossible ===
Being Impossible, or Yo, imposible is a 2018 Venezuelan-Colombian film about a woman who has never felt like she fits in and whose intersex identity has been hidden from her in a Venezuela that doesn't talk about deviance and a religious family that enforces strict gender roles.

=== Metamorphosis ===
Metamorphosis, a 2019 Philippine coming of age drama where an intersex teenager brought up as a boy called Adam in a conservative religious family. After having the shock of their first period and what follows is that they discover who they really are, testing both the physical and emotional strains on the family. Directed by JE Tiglao, starring Gold Aceron and Ricky Davao.

=== Fixed ===
Fixed is a 2025 adult animated American film directed by Genndy Tartakovsky. It features Frankie, an intersex Dobermann voiced by River Gallo, on whom a beagle named Lucky has a crush.

== See also ==
- Literature about intersex
- Television works about intersex
- Intersex characters in fiction
