= Stephen Potts =

British author of children's books

Stephen Potts (born 1957) is a British author of children's books, particularly historical adventure novels set at sea.

Potts was born in Norwich, England, to an English father then serving in the Royal Navy, and an Irish mother. He started school in northern Scotland, and continued in various parts of England, before entering Corpus Christi College, Cambridge, to study medical sciences. He subsequently transferred to Magdalen College, Oxford, to study clinical medicine, and while there rowed for Oxford University (Isis) in the 1981 Boat Race.

He continued medical studies in the United States, before returning to London and then Edinburgh to specialise in psychiatry. He works part-time as a Consultant in Liaison Psychiatry in Edinburgh Royal Infirmary, mainly in the emergency department and kidney, liver and pancreas transplant services.

He took up writing for children in the 1990s, beginning with a loosely connected trilogy collectively known as The Running Tide. The three books cover the period from the mid 19th century to the present day, and are variously set in Britain, Greenland and the Aleutian Islands. Described as “good, old-fashioned tales of courage and adventure” (Observer, 2001) they pit child protagonists against the dangers of the ocean and the polar ice, as well as malevolent adults.

His 2006 book, Abigail’s Gift, tells intertwined stories of a Highland lass at the time of the Clearances, and a modern schoolgirl troubled by bullying and an overactive imagination.

In March 2007 he was commissioned by Dynamic Entertainment DEH, a Dutch independent film production company, to adapt Philip Pullman’s 1992 novel The Butterfly Tattoo (previously published as The White Mercedes) as a feature film, released theatrically and on DVD in 2009.

== Bibliography ==
Children’s Prose

=== Novels ===
1999 Hunting Gumnor

Nominated for the Carnegie Medal 2000

Runner-up for the Branford Boase award 2000

Republished in 2004

2001 Compass Murphy

Shortlisted, Askews Children's Book Award 2002

Japanese translation published by Kyuryu-do 2005

Republished in 2004

2004 The Ship Thief

2006 Abigail's Gift

=== Shorter illustrated books for younger readers ===
2000 Tommy Trouble Nominated for the Carnegie Medal 2001

2008 Into the Storm

2009 Operation Hope

=== Short stories ===
1999 On the Bench (in Family Tree, ed. M Hodgson ) 2002 Abigail's Gift (in Love From Dad. ed M. Hodgson)

Radio

Grandmother’s Footsteps (Island Blue) broadcast on BBC Radio 4 in June 2006.

=== Medical ===
Potts has written or co-written scientific papers, books, book chapters, and editorials in the fields of non-cardiac chest pain, psychiatry, and euthanasia. He has contributed to the Edinburgh textbooks of psychiatry and medicine:

Legal and Ethical Aspects of Psychiatry (with JHM Crichton and RS Smyth) in Companion to Psychiatric Studies, 8th edition, eds Eve C Johnstone et al., Churchill Livingston Edinburgh 2010

Medical Psychiatry (with MC Sharpe) in Davidson’s Principles & Practice of Medicine, 20th edition, ed NA Boon et al., Churchill Livingstone, Edinburgh 2006
