= Lost in September =

2017 novel by Kathleen Winter

- First edition
- Author: Kathleen Winter
- Language: English
- Genre: Fiction
- Publisher: Knopf Canada
- Publication date: 12 September 2017
- Publication place: Canada
- Media type: Print
- ISBN: 978-0-345-81012-0

Lost in September is the second novel by Canadian writer Kathleen Winter, published in 2017.

Set in Montreal, the novel centres on Jimmy Blanchard, a mysterious homeless man who believes himself to be the reincarnation of 18th-century British general James Wolfe. Possessed of an encyclopedic knowledge of Wolfe's life, he is particularly obsessed with an 11-day furlough that Wolfe lost in 1752 when the British adoption of the Gregorian calendar resulted in his being summoned back to war earlier than planned, and believes his presence in contemporary Montreal to be a belated restoration of the furlough.

The novel was shortlisted for the Governor General's Award for English-language fiction at the 2017 Governor General's Awards. Onze jours en septembre, a French translation of the novel by Sophie Voillot, was shortlisted for the Governor General's Award for English to French translation at the 2019 Governor General's Awards.
