= Ash: A Secret History =

1999–2000 fantasy novel by Mary Gentle

First edition (pub. Gollancz/Orion) Cover art by John Howe

Ash: A Secret History is a historical fantasy novel by British author Mary Gentle first published in 2000. Set in the 15th century, the alternate history posts a fantastical "true" history of the world. In the United States, due to its length the novel was published in four paperback volumes: A Secret History (in 1999), Carthage Ascendant, Wild Machines, and Lost Burgundy (all in 2000).

== Plot summary ==
=== Framing device ===
The novel employs a framing device which claims that it is a work of scholarship, a translation of texts from the Late Middle Ages. The novel maintains a parallel narrative consisting of the emails between the historian writing the book and his publisher. Initially the author believes that the narrative is simply an embellished and romanticized account of actual events, but as the book goes on he begins to find evidence that the more fantastical claims in the book are true and begins to doubt reality around him. Throughout the novel, elements of fantasy and alternate history become more prominent such as golems, an alternate version of Carthage, and even an alternate Jesus Christ, referred to as "green Christ" and depicted on a tree rather than a cross.

=== Synopsis ===
Ash is an orphan foundling who grew up as a camp follower with a group of mercenaries. As a child, she discovers the Voice, a mysterious voice which only she can hear and which gives tactical advice on how to solve combat situations. As a woman in 1477, she now runs her own company, peopled by soldiers from various lands of Europe and North Africa, including her best friend the Burgundian physician Florian. Her company is hired by John de Vere, 13th Earl of Oxford, an exiled English nobleman, to undertake a mission to Italy for the Duke of Burgundy. When they arrive in Italy they discover the country under invasion from the forces of Carthage. This Carthage is not the civilization which clashed with Rome, but an empire established in North Africa by Visigoths. Owing to a magical curse cast by a rabbi, the lands of Carthage are covered in perpetual darkness. Ash's troops flee from the invaders and Ash meets with the general of the Carthaginian forces, the mysterious Faris. During the meeting, Ash is shocked to learn that the Faris is a duplicate of her. The Faris also hears the Voice, and is using its advice to conquer Europe.

As the conquest continues, darkness begins to settle over Europe. Ash herself is captured by the forces of the Faris and is sent to Carthage. There she learns the truth of her origins. Both she and the Faris are the result of a Carthaginian eugenics program designed to create a being capable of communicating with the "burnished head", a sort of mechanical military computer. The Faris was the successful result while Ash was a lesser result, intended to be destroyed but smuggled out of Carthage by a sympathetic servant. Before Ash can be killed, her men, led by Oxford, stage an assault on the city and free Ash from prison. As they leave, they pass by a set of pyramids. As they do, Ash feels a psychic presence similar to, but more powerful than, the Voice. She realizes that the pyramids are alive. They are sentient beings, artificial intelligences which they describe as "wild machines". They achieved sentience by accident and have watched mankind rise near them. Drawing their power from the sun it is they who have created the darkness above Carthage, absorbing the visible range of light to augment their powers. Working through the "burnished head" they instructed the forces of Carthage to create a being capable of communicating with the head across vast distances. They have also arranged the invasion of Europe to provide themselves with more power. Their aim is to channel that power through the Faris to create a "dark miracle": wiping out all human life.

Ash and her men escape Carthage and retreat to Europe. There they find Western and Central Europe almost totally under Carthage's control. With darkness descended on the continent crops are failing and people are starving. The last holdout is the Duchy of Burgundy which is besieged by the Faris and her forces. Getting in to Burgundy, Ash discovers that the Duke of Burgundy possesses supernatural abilities which maintain reality against attempts to change it. The wild machines need to kill the Duke in order to complete their dark miracle. Unfortunately the Duke dies from an infection during the siege, but the Carthaginian forces, not realizing the Duke's true importance, allow the Burgundians to conduct a ceremonial hunt in order to choose a successor. The winner is Florian, who is revealed as both a member of the Burgundian royal family and as a transvestite woman.

The new Duchess Floria takes her post, stabilizing reality, and Ash organizes an all-out assault designed to kill the Faris before the wild machines can complete their dark miracle. The assault succeeds, but Ash learns that the wild machines have a backup plan. They intend to use her to complete their dark miracle and they explain why they need to. "Grace" is an ability that all humans possess to some degree. This allows them to warp reality in certain ways. For most people this is trivial and hard to use. Some extraordinary people can create major miracles, such as the one which dried up the once great river which flowed near the wild machines. The machines have run simulations that show that in a few hundred years "grace" will be so prevalent and powerful among humanity that reality itself will unravel under the constant changes being instituted. In order to save reality, they must destroy humanity. Ash tries to reason with them but they insist. As the forces of Carthage attack and attempt to kill Floria, Ash determines to kill herself before the wild machines can work their dark miracle. The wild machines fight her and reality begins to change.

=== Ending ===
The framing device reveals what happened. When the wild machines worked their miracle in 1477 they did not destroy humanity. Instead they altered history. This resulted in our history, one where the ability to perform miracles was removed from mankind and various historic events, such as the establishment of a Visigothic Carthage in North Africa, or Jesus' status as a Roman centurion who worships Mithras are different.

== Awards ==
- 2000 British Science Fiction Association Award for Best Novel
- 2000 Sidewise Award for Alternate History
- 2006 Grand prix de l'Imaginaire for Translation

== See also ==
- Ilario, A Story of the First History, books set in the same alternative history.
