= Alex Stewart (writer) =

British writer (born 1958)

Alexander Michael Stewart (born 25 July 1958) is a British writer. His best known work is fiction written under the pseudonym Sandy Mitchell—Warhammer and Warhammer 40,000 novels, including the Ciaphas Cain series.

A full-time writer since the mid-1980s, the majority of his work (as Sandy Mitchell) has been tie-in fiction for Games Workshop's Warhammer fantasy and Warhammer 40,000 science fiction lines, as well as a novelisation of episodes from the high tech thriller series Bugs, for which he also worked as a scriptwriter under his real name.

He has also contributed some Warhammer roleplaying game material (including Scourge the Heretic, the first tie-in book to the Dark Heresy roleplaying game) as well as a number of short stories and magazine articles.

He lives in the North Essex village of Earls Colne, with his wife and daughter.

As a member of the Midnight Rose Collective he edited the Temps and EuroTemps collections of short stories with Neil Gaiman.

== Selected works ==
=== Warhammer 40,000 ===
In the Warhammer Universe, as ISFDB catalogues it, Sandy Mitchell is the sole author of Ciaphas Cain and Dark Heresy series (both listed completely here).

Ciaphas Cain series

Novels, all published by Black Library

- For The Emperor (2003)
- Caves of Ice (2004)
- The Traitor's Hand (2005)
- Death or Glory (2006)
- Duty Calls (2007)
- Cain's Last Stand (2008)
- The Emperor's Finest (2010)
- The Last Ditch (2012)
- The Greater Good (2013)
- Ciaphas Cain: Choose Your Enemies (2018)
- Ciaphas Cain: Vainglorious (2023)

Omnibus editions: Ciaphas Cain: Hero of the Imperium (Black, 2007), the first three novels plus short fiction; Ciaphas Cain: Defender of the Imperium (Black, 2010), the next three novels plus short fiction. Ciaphas Cain: Saviour of the Imperium (Black, 2018) followed, collecting a further three novels. An anthology reprinting Ciaphas Cain short stories is due to be released in early 2025.

Short fiction:

- "Fight or Flight", first published in the Black Library magazine Inferno! (Nov–Dec 2002); collected in Hero of the Imperium
- "The Beguiling", Inferno! (Mar–Apr 2003); in Hero of the Imperium
- "Echoes of the Tomb", Inferno! (Mar–Apr 2004); in Hero of the Imperium
- "Sector 13", Bringers of Death (Black, 2005), anthology; in Defender of the Imperium
- "Traitor's Gambit" (Black, 2009), limited edition chapbook for UK Games Day; in Defender of the Imperium

Dark Heresy series

- Scourge the Heretic (Black Library, 2008)
- Innocence Proves Nothing (2009)

=== Other ===
Short fiction

- "A Mug of Recaff" - published in Hammer and Bolter 20
- Old Soldiers Never Die (Novella) - to be released in November 2012.
- "The Smallest Detail" - published in Black Library Weekender (Anthology)
- "The Little Things" - published during the Black Library Weekender 2012

Audio dramas

- Dead in the Water (July 2011)
- The Devil You Know (April 2014)

Other

- " Good Man" - published in Sabbat Worlds (Anthology) (2010)
- "Hidden Depths" - published online in April 2014
- "Shooting the RIFT" - published by Baen in 2016
