= Orthe (series) =

Series of science fiction novels

Orthe is a series of science fiction novels by British writer Mary Gentle.

The Orthe series consists of the books Golden Witchbreed (published 1983) and Ancient Light (1987) and the short story "The Crystal Sunlight, the Bright Air" (1983, republished 1989 in Scholars and Soldiers). The action in both books takes place on a distant planet called Orthe, which is visited by Lynne de Lisle Christie, a British envoy from a future Earth that has developed a spacefaring civilization.

== Plot summary ==
As Golden Witchbreed opens, Christie has arrived on the technologically backward planet of Orthe ("Carrick V"), having been sent to evaluate whether it is suitable for trade and cultural contact with Earth. But Orthe, though possessing a complex social and political structure, turns out to have deliberately reverted to more primitive technologies after a catastrophe brought about by a previous technologically advanced race, the "Golden Witchbreed" or "Goldens". Unlike the Ortheans, Christie is blonde, which engenders hostility towards her as some take her to be a Witchbreed throwback.

Orthe consists largely of two continents, both of them only partially habitable since the catastrophe and linked by an archipelago of islands which supports a gigantic ruined Witchbreed structure, a kind of combined city and viaduct called the Rasrhe-y-Meluur. The main concentration of Ortheans is in the Suthai-Telestre or Southland (the habitable southern portion of the Northern continent), also known as the Hundred Thousand (meaning the approximately 100,000 telestres or small self-supporting communities which are the basis of Orthean society; they elect a ruler, the Crown, every ten years who rules from the island city of Tathcaer). Isolated cities of very different culture cling to the coast of the desert Southern continent. Male and female Ortheans have social parity and authority; Orthean children do not become male or female until puberty and a few remain latent throughout their lives - children and latents are referred to by the neutral pronoun ke.

Much of the novel concerns Christie's odyssey and adventures across the Suthai-Telestre, in the course of which she encounters fragmentary remains of the Witchbreed's civilization and is frequently in danger of her life. Early in the novel she befriends the charismatic Ruric Orhlandis, the one-armed female commander of the Southland army. After (just) surviving her journey through the Southlands Christie is summoned to the southern-continent city of Kasabaarde, whose Brown Tower is ruled by the mysterious 'Hexenmeister' who preserves the memory of all generations on Orthe, going back to the very alien race who first landed there and died out but brought the humanoid Witchbreed as their servitors. The half-breed survivors of the Witchbreed now live in the far southern city of Kel Harantish. Eventually Christie learns that Ruric has been behind the many attempts to kill or frame her, fearing what the corrupting Earth influence might do to Orthe. Ruric is imprisoned, escapes, fights a bitter, hopeless civil war and is driven into exile. Christie leaves the planet in sombre mood.

In Ancient Light, Christie returns to Orthe ten years later, this time as an unwilling representative of an Earth company that is looking for the lost technological secrets of the almost-extinct Witchbreed race that had destroyed its own civilization in Orthe's distant past, in order to exploit them. Political cohesion has been lost and, at the same time, war is developing between two groups on Orthe, worsened by the introduction of high-technology weapons. The novel is bleaker in tone than Golden Witchbreed. Characters from that novel are re-encountered, older, changed, more cynical; others are dead. Christie experiences visions of the fall of the Golden Empire. She returns to Kasabaarde and discovers the new Hexenmeister is Ruric Orhlandis.

Violence and killing spread: eventually in confused fighting in Tathcaer Ruric is killed. Christie buries her and prepares to become Hexenmeister in her stead by means of the memory transfer systems in the Brown Tower. They are destroyed before she can reach Kasabaarde by a vast explosion caused by the release of the Witchbreed weapon known as 'Ancient Light', a destroyer of organic life that leaves only crystal in its wake, leaving her with only partial memories of the lives of previous Hexenmeisters, thus preventing her (seemingly) from continuing their legacy.
