= Holly Greenberry-Pullen =

British intersex activist and politician

Councillor for North Tavistock
- Incumbent
- Assumed office May 2024
- Preceded by: Ursula Mann

Personal details
- Party: Liberal Democrats
- Education: Arts University Plymouth; University of Plymouth; Cardiff University

Holly Greenberry-Pullen, also known as Holly Greenberry, is a British local politician and the co-founder and co-director of Intersex UK, an advocacy organisation. She is a member of West Devon Borough Council after being elected as a councillor of North Tavistock in 2024. That same year, she was the Liberal Democrat parliamentary candidate for Plymouth Sutton and Devonport in the general election. She supports transgender rights as well as investment into education and healthcare.

== Education and career ==
Greenberry is a businesswoman from Princetown in Devon. Greenberry attended Arts University Plymouth before becoming a camera operator for the BBC and ITV. She pivoted into studying earth science at the University of Plymouth and became a geologist while working towards a post-graduate degree from Cardiff University. Greenberry worked as a lifeguard and assisted the elderly and people with mental health needs.

In 2011, Greenberry and Dawn Vago founded Intersex UK; it is a campaign group that aims to fight against intersex stigma, advocate for the intersex rights and protect, and end the use of "normalizing" medical and psychological treatments on intersex people such as genital mutilation. Greenberry and Vago work as the group's co-directors. They contribute to Intersex UK's awareness and education efforts. In 2015, Greenbury, Vago, and intersex activist Suz Tenko gave a talk to medical students and staff at Plymouth University. In 2015, both Vago and Greenberry placed fifth on the Rainbow List of 101 most influential gay, lesbian, intersex, transgender, and queer people in Britain. Greenberry was also the first intersex person to address the United Nations.

== Political involvement ==
Greenberry began political involvement being a Liberal Democrat candidate for the 2023 West Devon Borough Council election, standing in Dartmoor ward but was defeated by independent candidate Mark Christian Renders. She was elected to the North Tavistock seat of the West Devon Borough Council in a by-election in May 2024.

Greenberry-Pullen was selected by the Liberal Democrats to be the prospective parliamentary candidate for Plymouth Sutton and Devonport. At the 2024 United Kingdom general election, she was not elected, coming in fifth place but retained the election deposit. She was reportedly the only Intersex candidate in the general election. She ran for Devon County Council in the ward of Tavistock in 2025, but was not elected.

== Views ==
Greenberry supports transgender rights. In an article for The Guardian she said that "The irony is that where a trans kid can’t access a hormone blocker, an intersex child is operated on". She believes that transgender rights and intersex rights should be fought for together. She sees transgender and intersex as distinct from one another but with some shared issues.

While she was running for MP, she discussed ways to improve her community. She said there needed to be more investment into education as well as more funding, staff, and training put towards healthcare services.

Greenberry is part of the campaign group Parents of Children with Special Educational Needs and Disabilities, also called SEND Parents. The group campaigned against Devon County Council's shortcomings to support disabled children. Greenberry described securing a secondary school for her child with a disability as a "horrendous process".

== Personal life ==
Greenberry is pansexual and intersex. She identifies as a woman; however, she was assigned male on her birth certificate and raised as a boy because she was born with partial androgen insensitivity syndrome (PAIS). She described growing up as an intersex person in the 1980s and 1990s as "pretty brutal". She was often called homophobic and transphobic slurs. Neither Greenbury nor her parents were given professional support, nor were the biological differences from her intersex variation clearly explained. Due to her PAIS, she did not develop masculine secondary sex characteristics during puberty, instead becoming more feminine. She felt isolated during her development while trying to identify as male.

In her teens and early adulthood, she went through numerous surgeries to make her body conform to gender norms. She feels that she was unable to give fully informed consent since she was initially misdiagnosed. The surgery was damaging and resulted in further follow-up surgeries. Greenberry says, "It all could have been prevented if there had been more medical understanding and if there had been less haste in trying to guess which label best fitted. I should have been allowed to be an ambiguous teenager with the freedom to express my natural gender."

She continued undergoing surgeries into her 30s. Some were to undo changes from her previous surgeries, while others were to repair prior procedures that had deteriorated over time. Due to the surgeries, she became physically scarred and was repeatedly admitted to the hospital. The scarring caused her to turn down a modelling contract in her late teens. She also experiences symptoms from hormone replacement therapy, which she needs due to her body being unable to make necessary amounts of oestrogen.

She is a single-mother of two children.
