= Golden Witchbreed =

1983 science fiction novel by Mary Gentle

Golden Witchbreed is a novel by Mary Gentle published in 1983.

== Plot summary ==
Golden Witchbreed is a novel in which Christie is on the planet Orthe as an envoy from Earth.

== Reception ==
Dave Langford reviewed Golden Witchbreed for White Dwarf #46, and stated that "Golden Witchbreed is not for those who demand slambang action and exploding suns. Its leisurely opening will irritate some: Gentle is almost arrogant in her refusal to do anything quick and obvious by way of narrative hook. Eventually, though, you wish the book were longer. The author writes with enviable calmness and assurance, and has produced a remarkably good novel."

== Reviews ==
- Review by Faren Miller (1983) in Locus #273, October 1983
- Review by Baird Searles (1984) in Isaac Asimov's Science Fiction Magazine, May 1984
- Review by Amy Thomson (1989) in The New York Review of Science Fiction, August 1989
- Review by Kathy Taylor (1997) in Vector 191
