= Serres (TV series) =

- Logo for season 2
- Σέρρες
- Genre: Drama; Comedy
- Created by: Giorgos Kapoutzidis
- Written by: Giorgos Kapoutzidis
- Directed by: Stamatis Patronis
- Starring: Panos Natsis; Giorgos Zygouris; Giorgos Gallos; Marilou Katsafadou; Giouli Tsagaraki; Lena Drosaki; Giorgos Vouvakis; Konstantinos Moutaftsis; Louiza Pyriohou; Eleni Ouzounidou
- Composer: Phivos Delivorias
- Country of origin: Greece
- Original language: Greek
- No. of seasons: 2
- No. of episodes: 20

Production
- Production locations: Serres, Greece
- Running time: 30 minutes
- Production company: Pedio Productions

Original release
- Network: ANT1
- Release: 12 April 2022 – 28 October 2025

Serres (Greek: Σέρρες) is a Greek drama television series that premiered on ANT1 in 2022, running for two seasons. The second season was made in collaboration with Netflix, and released in 2025. The show is set in Serres, Greece. The series focuses on Odysseas, a gay man, and his relationship with his conservative father Lefteris.

The series was created and written by Giorgos Kapoutzidis. In Greece, the show has been notable for its affirming portrayal of gay people and intersex people. The show has been praised for shifting the portrayal of LGBTQIA+ individuals on Greek television away from stereotypes and caricatures.

== Synopsis ==
After his mother dies, Odysseas returns to his hometown of Serres. He had left Serres for the big city of Athens to live freely and openly as a gay man. Lefteris, the father who had been cold and homophobic to Odysseas growing up, now finds himself dependent on Odysseas. Odysseas moves back to Serres, and Lefteris learns to accept his son for who he is. With encouragement from his Aunt Stamatina and his friend Chrysa, Odysseas opens a gay café in Serres, and finds love.

== Cast and characters ==
- Odysseas (Panos Natsis, season 1; Giorgos Zygouris, season 2), an openly gay man living in Athens at the start of the series. He is in his 30s. He is estranged from his conservative father. When his mother Eftychia dies, he returns to his rural hometown of Serres for the 40 days of mourning. His mother had been the only member of his family who accepted and supported him for being gay.
- Lefteris Christidis (Giorgos Gallos), father of Odysseas. An older conservative man who never approved of Odysseas' sexual orientation, and was cruel to him growing up. After his wife Eftychia dies, Lefteris has a stroke, and can no longer live independently. Of his three adult children, only Odysseas is willing to look after him, prompting Lefteris to connect with his son. A proud man, he must learn how to accept help from his son Odysseas and his sister Stamatina.
- Aunt Stamatina (Giouli Tsagaraki), younger sister of Lefteris. A conservative spinster in her 60s who is deeply lonely. She is intersex, but this was kept secret from her and her brother. She grew up marginalized, but not understanding why. She encourages Odysseas to open a gay establishment in Serres, and sews him a pride flag to hang out front. She helps to promote the café, and finds community there.
- Chrysa (Marilou Katsafados), a childhood friend of Odysseas who supports him in his move back to Serres. Like Odysseas, she is in her 30s. She is single and looking for love. In season 2, she is a part-time actor in a film starring Apostolos Bonis.
- Nansy (Lena Drosaki), older sister of Odysseas, a fashion influencer who is struggling psychologically. She wants a divorce from her husband Michalis, but he is not willing to divorce.
- Thomas (Konstantinos Moutaftsis), older brother of Odysseas
- Eftychia (Eleni Ouzounidou), mother of Odysseas. She appears in flashbacks. Before her death, she had made plans to renovate the house she shared with Lefteris. These renovations are made at the start of season 2.
- Areti (Eirini Valatsou)
- Angelos (Alexandros Piechoviak), love interest of Odysseas in season 2. A travel blogger. He is in a relationship with the closeted movie star Apostolos Bonis.
- Apostolos Bonis (Vassilis Michas), a movie star. He is in a secret relationship with Angelos.
- Katerina (Louisa Pyriochoou), wife of Thomas
- Michalis (Giorgos Vouvakis), husband of Nansy
- Stathis (Stratis Chatzistamatiou), love interest of Chrysa in season 2. A 22-year-old footballer playing for Panserraikos F.C.

== Episodes ==
Season	Episodes	Originally released	
Season	Episodes	First released	Last released
1	10	April 12, 2022	June 3, 2022
2	10	September 23, 2025	October 28, 2025

== Production ==
Series creator and writer Giorgos Kapoutzidis grew up in Serres, Greece, and describes the writing as "deeply personal" but not autobiographical.

The series was filmed in Athens, Thessaloniki and Serres.

The first season was released three months after lead actor Panos Natsis died in a car accident. Natsis' death was a blow to the production team, and there was uncertainty of the show would have another season. The positive response from the LGBTQ+ community to the first season helped motivate the team to continue. Odysseas was recast for the second season.

The show was initially aired on ANT1, and released on Netflix later on. When the first season was added to Netflix on January 15, 2024, it reached the top of the streaming charts within 48 hours of release.

== Intersex representation ==
The show marked the first time a character was explicitly called "intersex" in a Greek television production, and the first time a recurring intersex character was in featured on prime-time Greek television. In season 2, Stamatina goes to the doctor for abdominal pain, and then learns that she is intersex and that this fact had been concealed from her. She had been subjected to surgery as a baby. She grew up feeling lonely, feeling in the margins of society, and always "in between", but not knowing why. After learning she is intersex, Stamatina is welcomed into the local LGBTQIA+ community.

Series creator Giorgos Kapoutzidis consulted with members of the intersex community when writing the series. The episode which revealed Stamatina as intersex trended on Greek social media. Intersex Greece praised the show for depicting an intersex character realistically and with sensitivity.

== Critical reception ==
The show has received a number of positive reviews from the Greek media. In her review of the series, media journalist Maria Hadjipetrou called it the best series of the Greek television season, and that Kapoutzidis has matured as a screenwriter. She praised the humour, as well as the social commentary about the vanity of social media influencers and the difficulties of modern dating.

Hadjipetrou credits Giouli Tsagaraki's performance as Aunt Stamatina for the series' success. She explains that in rural Greece, if a middle-aged aunt learnt her nephew was gay, she would take him to a priest for exorcism. But the show subverts expectations: Stamatina is a source of support for her nephew. Culture journalist Annie Tzavella noted that the show marked the first time an openly gay man was in a leading role on Greek television.

Culture reporter Fany Charalampidi argued the show stands out for its courageous LGBTQIA+ representation. Similarly, Ioanna Loumani praised the "sensitive and sharp" writing of Kapoutzidis, calling the show a "hymn to diversity, empathy, and acceptance". And Christiana Stylania praised how the show raises awareness of intersex people without lectures, but instead portraying human emotion and fresh humour.

== See also ==
- Intersex representation in television
