= Grunts! =

1992 satiric fantasy novel by Mary Gentle

- First edition
- Author: Mary Gentle
- Cover artist: Les Edwards
- Language: English
- Genre: Fantasy, Comic fantasy, Satire, Black comedy
- Publisher: Bantam Press
- Publication date: 1992
- Publication place: United Kingdom
- Media type: Print
- Pages: 464
- ISBN: 0-451-45453-7

Grunts! (1992), titled Grunts in at least one edition, is a satiric fantasy novel by British writer Mary Gentle. Deviating typical secondary world fantasy genre, conventional elements such as orcs and elves, magic and medieval weaponry are present, but with black comedy and graphic description of violence, frequently depicting scenes "over the top."

== Plot summary ==
The story follows a group of orcs who always find themselves on the front lines of battle against the carefully prepared and always triumphant forces of good. The orcs decided to organize themselves and fight back. As a satire of high fantasy the novel mocks most of the conventions of the genre from using traditional villainous races, orcs, as the protagonists, to having the noble characters have much less than noble motivations and secrets.

The opening of the book plays up the orc warleader sent to reclaim a weapons cache in preparation for the 'Last Battle' between good and evil, which is well on its way. They are assisted by a pair of halflings whose cute demeanor is contrasted with extremely violent acts.

The orcs uncover a dragon's hoard of modern military weaponry, which is endowed with a geas that transforms their minds into replicas of the stereotypical United States Marine Corps mindset, during the Vietnam War. Gentle continues the storyline through the Last Battle and the orcs' integration into society, along with a military threat that rivals the orcs themselves.
