= The Butterfly Tattoo (film) =

- Directed by: Phil Hawkins
- Screenplay by: Stephen Potts
- Based on: The White Mercedes by Philip Pullman
- Produced by: Rik Visser; Wesley Kloppenburg; Jolies van Emburg
- Starring: Jessica Blake; Duncan Stuart; Aidan Magrath; Christopher Dane
- Cinematography: Michael Costelloe
- Music by: Richard Bodgers
- Production company: Dynamic Entertainment DEH
- Release dates: 13 September 2008 (Film by the Sea Festival); 25 September 2009 (United Kingdom)
- Running time: 101 minutes
- Countries: United Kingdom; Netherlands

The Butterfly Tattoo is a 2008 feature film, based on Philip Pullman's 1992 novel The White Mercedes (also released as The Butterfly Tattoo). The film is particularly notable given that despite being a commercial production it actively sought to provide training and experience for young film-makers. The film also used a novel method of financing its production, by selling shares to members of the public.

== Plot ==
Chris, a naive lad, suspended between school and college, and Jenny, a free spirit fleeing a traumatised childhood, fall in love against the backdrop of modern Oxford. But they are caught in the crossfire, as the past of Barry Miller catches up with him in the form of Carson, a gangster out for revenge.

== Cast ==
- Jessica Blake as Jenny
- Duncan Stuart as Chris Marshall
- Aidan Magrath as Barry Miller
- Christopher Dane as Inspector Fletcher

== Production ==
=== Development ===
The Dutch production company Dynamic Entertainment DEH optioned the film rights to the novel in 2006, with the aim of producing a community supported open-source film. Award winning young director Phil Hawkins became attached to the project in early 2007. Children's author Stephen Potts adapted the story for the screen. Auditions were held across the country to find the young cast.

The producers used a novel means of financing the film, selling shares publicly to raise the $400,000 budget. The film was fully funded in just two days. The author Philip Pullman was particularly supportive of the production saying "I liked the fact that they were very young and very keen, and that they didn't have any money".

The production welcomed applications from both experienced and inexperienced people to join the crew, stating the educational aspect was a key part of the film.

=== Filming ===
The film was shot on location in and around Oxford, and a few miles away in a studio at Howbery Park near Wallingford. Filming began on 27 August 2007 for five weeks. A series of behind the scenes videos were released online during the production.

=== Music ===
The score was composed by Richard Bodgers, whilst several bands local to the Oxford area where the film was shot also contributed to the soundtrack.

== Release ==
The film had its public première on 13 September 2008 at the International Film by the Sea festival in Vlissingen, Netherlands. This was followed by screenings at the Dutch Film Festival, the New York International Independent Film and Video Festival, where it was the opening feature, and the Exposures Film Festival in Manchester. The film had a limited release in Los Angeles on 17 April 2009.

The film was released by the Showcase Cinemas chain on 25 September 2009, following its screening at the Cambridge Film Festival on 18 and 21 September 2009.

== Awards ==
New York International Independent Film and Video Festival

- Best Director, Phil Hawkins
- Best Adaptation

Columbus International Film & Video Festival

- Best Feature Film

Beaufort International Film Festival

- Best Film

== Home media ==
The DVD was released in the US on 2 June 2009.

Despite only being a small, independent production, in just a few days after the US DVD release the film had attracted considerable attention on the internet. By 19 June 2009 it had been illegally downloaded over 200,000 times
