= The White Mercedes =

1992 book by Philip Pullman

- First edition
- Author: Philip Pullman
- Language: English
- Genre: Young adult fiction
- Publisher: Macmillan
- Publication date: 1992
- Publication place: United Kingdom
- Pages: 186
- ISBN: 0-330-39796-6
- OCLC: 47063215

The White Mercedes, published in 1992 and now known as The Butterfly Tattoo, is about one character who falls passionately in love, and suffers horribly from then on, as his innocent love is embroiled in a long cycle of revenge and hatred. It was Philip Pullman's first book for younger audiences, which won him critical acclaim from many sources.

== Plot summary ==
This book is split into three parts: the first deals with Chris's first meeting of Jenny, the second with his search for her, and the third with the tragic ending. The first sentence gives away the doomed nature of the book: Chris Marshall met the girl he was going to kill on a warm Oxford evening....

The seventeen-year-old main character, Chris, works for a lighting company in Oxford, England. While rigging up a party he inadvertently rescues a beautiful young woman in a white dress from upper class thugs. Smitten, he looks for her, but she has disappeared into the night, leaving the white dress in a boat shed. Before she goes, however, he finds out that her name is Jenny, and that she had gatecrashed the party. The thugs' leader, Piers, recognised her and was threatening to turn her in, unless she slept with him.

He then searches for her for many weeks, and eventually finds her squatting in an empty house with two friends (not, as he fears, lovers). He asks her out on a date, and she accepts, much to his joy. After this, he goes to his father's house (his parents have divorced three weeks ago; their emotionless parting chills him), and meets his mistress, his secretary Diane. She asks him how his mother is, hoping that she hasn't forced her to suicide by taking her husband away from her. Chris tells her that she has a boyfriend, called Mike, and she is feeling much better.

His father mentions that they are going abroad for a weekend together, and asks him if he would house sit for them. Of course, Chris agrees, and plans to bring Jenny there for a romantic weekend, as his father would be having in Paris. After another date (in which they ironically see Romeo and Juliet) Chris asks Jenny to spend the weekend with him at his father's house after they kiss passionately in the park. She says that she will be there.

Meanwhile, we hear about Jenny's past at the hands of her abusive father. She comes from Yorkshire (and still retains a Northern accent), and after suffering at his hands very literally leaves home on the morning of her sixteenth birthday. The story is set a year later.

On the night which she was supposed to arrive, she does not come. And so, crestfallen and lovesick, Chris goes to bed. The next morning Jenny arrives, and after having tea on the porch they go into his father's bedroom and make love. He is a virgin, while she is much more experienced, and he notices she has a tattoo of a butterfly above her left breast (hence the title).

The next day, when she leaves, Jenny finds that the house in which she and her friends had been illegally squatting has been the victim of a police drugs raid. Her hippie flatmates are taken into custody for possession of cannabis, and, despite her innocence, Jenny flees the scene, since she does not trust the police as they failed to help her over her father's abuse. Because of this, not knowing Chris's address or even his last name, she loses contact with him.

We then learn about the shady past of Chris's boss, Barry. He used to belong to the Carson gang, an outfit of petty thieves trying to pull a big heist. They tried to get the contents of a Securicor van, but they failed, and in the ensuing chaos one of the thick witted Carson brothers killed one of the security guards. With the police chasing them, they recklessly tackled another van, this time succeeding and killing two more men. Barry felt his conscience pricking him, and after making off with the thousands of pounds from the van turned the Carson brothers in to the Law. He gave evidence in court and one of the three Carson brothers were killed in the gunfight to take them, the other was sentenced to twenty five years in jail. Barry Springer changed his name by deed poll to Miller, and he, his wife and his small son were relocated from London to Oxford under the Witness Protection Act. The one remaining Carson brother, Edward, was not like his brothers; while they were dim-witted thugs he was like a modern-day Moriarty, and set his sights on ruthlessly hunting down Barry, and avenging his brothers.

While Chris, frantic and love stricken, searches Oxford for Jenny, she finds work with a friend as a waitress. Her boss, who, like most of the men she meets, reminds her of her father, seeks to take advantage of her, and she avoids him as much as possible, spending all her spare time searching for Chris. Fate, it seems, is against them, for the obnoxious boss Jenny works for so disgusted Chris when he came looking for a job that he vowed never to go there again, and although they catch tantalising glimpses of each other occasionally, they do not find each other, and as Jenny's love begins to cool, Chris's only intensifies.

At this point Barry, Chris's boss, shows him a "chalet" which he has bought by the canal, and wants to fix up. When Chris asks him why he has it, he gives a kaleidoscopic version of the truth about his dealings with the Carson gang, shifting the drama to Ireland and the IRA. He then pays Chris to fix it up, and enthuses about an infrared light switch out at the front, so that the light will go on if anyone comes near it.

Through a remarkable coincidence, after Jenny quits her job as a waitress, since her boss's attentions prove too much for her, she ends up babysitting for Chris's boss's eleven-year-old son, Sean. He is the epitome of innocence as he explains the cosmos to her, and teaches her to play chess. When she kisses him goodnight, she finds herself kissing him like a lover; she stops when she realises this, and downstairs feels revulsion at what her father has made her become. After she's put him to bed the phone rings and Jenny answers, hearing, “Tell him Carson's getting warm.” She only tells Barry about the call when he is driving her home. Barry goes completely white and tells her about the shed.

Things start spinning out of control as Chris continues to ache for Jenny. Right then he decides to return to the shed to get the knife he’d forgotten. As he approaches the chalet he sees Jenny and Barry exiting the chalet together. Being in a dark mood he immediately believes Barry has found himself a new plaything. The truth is less shocking; Barry had simply asked the girl to do some painting and hang a few curtains to make the place more liveable. Chris turns away, in tears, before either of them sees him.

Lying in bed, Chris realises he should have confronted the two and makes up his mind to do just that the next day. That morning, unsure of what he's going to say, he goes to the warehouse. Barry isn’t there, but a police officer named Fletcher in an expensive white Mercedes is. He tells Chris he is looking for Barry Springer, a dangerous criminal — the man Chris knows as his boss. After a little pushing Chris agrees to betray his one-time friend and set him up to be captured at the shed later that night.

Jenny again babysits Sean that night. As Sue is about to leave the house she tells her Barry might be a little late because he’ll be checking on Chris at the chalet. For the first time Jenny has hopes of seeing Chris again as Sue confirms it's indeed her lover in the shed.

Chris, deliberately betraying a friend, is restless and decides to bike around town. He runs into Dave who is celebrating his birthday at a local pub. After some random drunk talk Dave tells Chris about Carson in the white Mercedes at the warehouse earlier. The boy immediately realises his stupid mistake. His anger had blinded him so much he never saw the obvious.

In panic he asks one of the girls at the party to call Barry at his house. But he is out, while Jenny receives the message on his new answering machine: “For God’s sake keep away from the shed. Carson’s on his way there.” Without hesitation she takes Sue’s bike and races to the shed to save Chris.

Chris goes home to call Barry, then races towards the shed when Sue tells him about Jenny. Riding his bike like a demon he arrives at the woods and jumps off his bike to run toward the chalet. He hears the low grumble, as if produced by a giant beast, behind him. Terrified, he realises it is the white Mercedes. In full sprint he runs to the shed. He enters the clearing, and as he calls out for Jenny he hears the deafening report of a gun, six times. Carson leaves, Barry arrives, and Chris enters the chalet to find his beloved Jenny on the bed, soaked in her blood and riddled with bullets. She had written on the wall in her own blood, "DAD."

Her dad, at the inquest, covers his face with his hands. Chris understands that to be a father whom Jenny wanted to be next to her as she died. Chris is happy that she was able to say it before she died.

== Film adaptation ==
The Dutch production company Dynamic Entertainment DEH optioned the rights to adapt The Butterfly Tattoo as a motion picture and Phil Hawkins, became attached to direct the film in early 2007. Children's writer Stephen Potts adapted the story for the screen and auditions were held across the country to find the young cast.

== See also ==
- Dynamic Entertainment DEH
- Film website
- The Butterfly Tattoo on Imdb
- The Butterfly Tattoo Teaser Trailer on YouTube
