= Fixing Sex =

2008 book by Katrina Karkazis

Fixing Sex: Intersex, Medical Authority, and Lived Experience
- Author: Katrina Karkazis
- Language: English
- Genre: Medicine and health sciences
- Publisher: Duke University Press
- Publication date: November 14, 2009
- Publication place: United States
- Media type: Print (Paperback and Hardback) and E-book
- Pages: 384
- ISBN: 978-0822343189

Fixing Sex: Intersex, Medical Authority, and Lived Experience, a book by Stanford anthropologist and bioethicist Katrina Karkazis, was published in 2008. Described as "thoughtful", "meticulous", and an "authoritative treatise on intersex", the book examines the perspectives of intersex people, their families, and clinicians to offer compassionate look at the treatment of people born with atypical sex characteristics.

== Synopsis ==
In a scholarly work, Karkazis draws heavily on interviews with intersex adults, parents, and physicians to explore how intersex is understood and treated. In part 1, she reviews the history of treatment for intersex traits, highlighting the work of John Money and the introduction of the, then new, terms "gender", "gender role" and "gender identity". She explores the events following publication of Milton Diamond's study of the David Reimer or "John/Joan" case, and the ways in which public opinion impacted on medical treatment. In part 2, Karkazis presents an analysis of current medical approaches to intersex, and the risks involved, in the wake of a 2006 "consensus statement on the management of intersex disorders". She also reviews the methods utilised to assign a sex of rearing to intersex infants, such as genitals and penis size, chromosomes, fertility, "sexing of the brain", and parental wishes; these impact upon determination whether or not to proceed with early genital surgery. Part 3 interviews parents of children with complete androgen insensitivity syndrome and congenital adrenal hyperplasia, and adults with intersex experiences. Part 3 also looks at activism by intersex organizations.

== Reception ==
The book has been well received by both clinicians and intersex groups. Gary Berkovitz, writing in the New England Journal of Medicine states that Karkazis's analysis is fair, compelling, and eloquent; "Current consensus guidelines recommend early separation of the vagina and urethra for female subjects with abnormalities in the formation of the sex organs... Karkazis presents a compelling argument for the deferment of subsequent surgery until the patient is able to decide." Elizabeth Reis, reviewing the book in the American Journal of Bioethics, states that the book identifies risk of incontinence, fistulas, scarring and lack of physical sensation arising from surgical intervention, and the psychological harm caused by the knowledge that "one's genitals are 'wrong,' requiring constant medical scrutiny and 'fixing'. It "masterfully examines the concerns and fears of all those with a stake in the intersex debate: physicians, parents, intersex adults, and activists. ... Karkazis’s honest, multi-pronged approach poses critical questions." Mijeon in the American Journal of Human Genetics writes that the "conclusion is quite fitting", "the history of thinking about the body ... can be highly politicized and controversial". Kenneth Copeland, former president of the Lawson Wilkins Pediatric Endocrine Society, describes the book as "Masterfully balancing all aspects of one of the most polarizing, contentious topics in medicine... the most recent authoritative treatise on intersex."

Gayle Rubin describes the book as "meticulous, sensitive, and brilliantly executed". Arlene Baratz (Accord Alliance) describes the book as "a velvet-gloved punch to the gut", "astonishing, a tale told straight from the mouths of affected adults, parents, and physicians in tender and lyrical prose." Intersex community organization Organisation Intersex International Australia regards the book as "approachable," "compelling and recommended reading".

The book was referenced by Involuntary or coerced sterilisation of intersex people in Australia, a 2013 report of a committee of the Senate of Australia in 2013.

== Awards and recognition ==
The book was nominated for the Margaret Mead Award, 2010, and a finalist for the Lambda Literary Award, 2009.
