= Katrina Karkazis =

American anthropologist and bioethicist

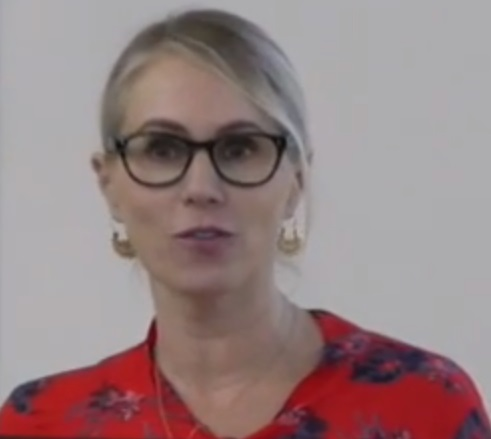
- Karkazis at Schulich School of Law in 2018
- Born: 1970
- Education: Columbia University
- Awards: Guggenheim Fellowship (2016)
- Scientific career
- Fields: Anthropology and bioethics
- Workplaces: Amherst College, Stanford University, Honors Academy Brooklyn College, Emory University
- Thesis: Beyond treatment: mapping the connections among gender, genitals, and sexuality in recent controversies over intersexuality (2002)
- Doctoral advisor: Carole S. Vance
- Other academic advisors: Sherry B. Ortner, Shirley Lindenbaum, Lesley Sharp, E. Valentine Daniel
- Website: katrinakarkazis.com

Katrina Alicia Karkazis (born 1970) is an American anthropologist and bioethicist. She is a professor of Sexuality, Women's and Gender Studies at Amherst College. She was previously the Carol Zicklin Endowed Chair in the Honors Academy at Brooklyn College, City University of New York and a senior research fellow with the Global Health Justice Partnership at Yale University. She has written widely on testosterone, intersex issues, sex verification in sports, treatment practices, policy and lived experiences, and the interface between medicine and society. In 2016, she was jointly awarded a Guggenheim Fellowship with Rebecca Jordan-Young.

== Career ==
Katrina Karkazis received her PhD in medical and cultural anthropology, and a Masters in Public Health in maternal and child health, from Columbia University. She has an undergraduate degree in Public Policy from Occidental College. Karkazis completed postdoctoral training in empirical bioethics at Stanford Center for Biomedical Ethics. After spending 15 years at Stanford, she was the Carol Zicklin Endowed Chair in the Honors Academy at Brooklyn College, City University of New York. She has been a visiting professor at Emory University and is currently a Senior Visiting Fellow with the Global Health Justice Partnership at Yale University.

In 2008, Karkazis published her first book, Fixing Sex, on the medical treatment and lived experience of intersex people. Since the publication of Fixing Sex and co-authoring a 2012 journal article on sex testing in sport, Out of Bounds, Karkazis has widely written and been quoted as an expert on issues of informed consent, bodily diversity, testosterone, and access to sport. Media coverage of sport issues includes American Association for the Advancement of Science, The Guardian, Los Angeles Times, New Scientist, New York Times and Time, often in collaboration with Rebecca Jordan-Young.

In 2015, Karkazis testified before the Court of Arbitration for Sport (CAS) in the case of Dutee Chand v. Athletics Federation of India (AFI) & The International Association of Athletics Federations (IAAF), and in July 2015 the CAS issued a decision to suspend its sex verification policy on excluding women athletes with hyperandrogenism (high levels of testosterone) due to insufficient evidence of a link between high androgen levels and improved athletic performance. The court allowed two further years for convincing evidence to be submitted by the IAAF, after which the regulation will be automatically revoked if evidence has not been provided.

In 2016, Karkazis was awarded a Guggenheim Fellowship by the John Simon Guggenheim Memorial Foundation to work on a book on testosterone, Testosterone: An Unauthorized Biography, published by Harvard University Press in 2019 and written with Rebecca Jordan-Young. In 2018, Karkazis wrote in The New York Review of Books that "T has become a powerful technology for the production of subjectivity, the most consequential of which is gender."

== Works ==
=== Books ===
Fixing Sex: Intersex, Medical Authority, and Lived Experience, published by Duke University Press in 2008 presents a history of the medical treatment and lived experience of intersex people and their families. The book has been well received by both clinicians and intersex groups. Gary Berkovitz, writing in the New England Journal of Medicine states that Karkazis's analysis is fair, compelling, and eloquent. Elizabeth Reis, reviewing the book in American Journal of Bioethics, states that the book "masterfully examines the concerns and fears of all those with a stake in the intersex debate: physicians, parents, intersex adults, and activists." Mijeon, in American Journal of Human Genetics writes that the "conclusion is quite fitting", "the history of thinking about the body ... can be highly politicized and controversial". Kenneth Copeland MD, former president of the Lawson Wilkins Pediatric Endocrine Society describes the book as, "Masterfully balancing all aspects of one of the most polarizing, contentious topics in medicine... the most recent authoritative treatise on intersex." Intersex community organization Organisation Intersex International Australia regards the book as "approachable," "compelling and recommended reading", and the book was subsequently cited by the Senate of Australia in 2013.

Testosterone: An Unauthorized Biography, published by Harvard University Press in 2019, focuses on what testosterone does in six domains: reproduction, aggression, risk-taking, power, sports, and parenting. It has been reviewed in Science and Nature.

=== Peer-reviewed publications ===
In Out of Bounds? A Critique of the New Policies on Hyperandrogenism in Elite Female Athletes, a collaborative article with Georgiann Davis, Rebecca Jordan-Young, and Silvia Camporesi, published in 2012 in the American Journal of Bioethics, they argue that a new sex testing policy by the International Association of Athletics Federations will not protect against breaches of privacy, will require athletes to undergo unnecessary treatment in order to compete, and will intensify "gender policing". They recommend that athletes be able to compete in accordance with their legal gender. The analysis was described as an "influential critique" in the Los Angeles Times.

In Emotionally and cognitively informed consent for clinical care for differences of sex development, co-authored with Anne Tamar-Mattis, Arlene Baratz, and Katherine Baratz Dalke and published in 2013, the authors write that "physicians continue to recommend certain irreversible treatments for children with differences of sex development (DSD) without adequate psychosocial support".

In What’s in a Name? The Controversy over “Disorders of Sex Development”, co-authored with Ellen Feder and published in 2008, the authors state that "tracing the history of the terminology applied to those with atypical sex anatomy reveals how these conditions have been narrowly cast as problems of gender to the neglect of broader health concerns and of the well-being of affected individuals." Karkazis and Feder also collaborated in Naming the Problem: Disorders and Their Meanings, published in The Lancet in 2008.

=== Selected bibliography ===
- Karkazis, Katrina; Jordan-Young, Rebecca (September 26, 2020). "The Powers of Testosterone: Obscuring Race and Regional Bias in the Regulation of Women Athletes". Feminist Formations. 30 (2): 1–39. doi:10.1353/ff.2018.0017. S2CID 149739328.
- Karkazis, Katrina; Carpenter, Morgan (September 26, 2020). "Impossible "choices": the inherent harms of regulating women's testosterone in sport" (PDF). Journal of Bioethical Inquiry. 15 (4): 579–587. doi:10.1007/s11673-018-9876-3. PMID 30117064. S2CID 52014175 – via Springer.
- Karkazis, Katrina; Fishman, Jennifer (September 26, 2020). "Tracking U.S. Professional Athletes: The Ethics of Biometric Technologies". The American Journal of Bioethics. 17 (1): 45–60. doi:10.1080/15265161.2016.1251633. PMID 27996918. S2CID 6847359 – via Taylor & Francis Online.
- Karkazis, Katrina (September 26, 2020). "Sensing Race as a Ghost Variable in Science, Technology, and Medicine". Science, Technology, & Human Values. 45 (5): 763–778. doi:10.1177/0162243920939306. S2CID 220855390 – via SAGE Journals.
- Karkazis, Katrina (September 26, 202). "The misuses of "biological sex"". The Lancet. 394 (10212): 1898–1899. doi:10.1016/S0140-6736(19)32764-3. PMID 31982044. S2CID 208231318 – via Europe PMC.

== Awards and recognition ==
Fixing Sex: Intersex, Medical Authority, and Lived Experience was nominated for the Margaret Mead Award, 2010, and a finalist for the Lambda Literary Award, 2009. In 2016, Karkazis was awarded a Guggenheim Fellowship.
