= Intersex representation in television =

Intersex, in humans and other animals, describes variations in sex characteristics including chromosomes, gonads, sex hormones, or genitals that, according to the UN Office of the High Commissioner for Human Rights, "do not fit typical binary notions of male or female bodies".

Intersex people and themes appear in numerous television episodes. Representations have often lacked realism, and in some cases described as stigmatizing or garbage by intersex advocates, with some examples of "everyday social types" but many cases of medical dilemmas, murderers, and ciphers for discussions about sex and gender.

== Themes and tropes in intersex representation ==
Intersex people have been portrayed in fiction as monsters, murderers and medical dilemmas. Canadian sociologist Morgan Holmes, a former activist with the (now defunct) Intersex Society of North America describes fictional representations of intersex people as monsters or ciphers for discussions about sex and gender. Academic and filmmaker Phoebe Hart suggests that television representations of intersex people fulfil "sensational and unsubtle" stereotypes: the Australian drama All Saints portrayed a woman with androgen insensitivity syndrome as both "superwoman" and "genetic glitch", while Grey's Anatomy failed to adequately inform audiences about intersex in an episode that explored gender identity and medical disclosure. Hart highlights Faking It and Freaks and Geeks for presenting realistic characters, or everyday social types. She suggests that other television representations have been more controversial, and sometimes potentially harmful.

An intersex murderer plot twist trope has been repeated in the TV programs Nip/Tuck (Quentin Costa), Janet King, and Passions (Vincent Clarkson). Examples of a medical dilemmas trope include the 2010 Childrens Hospital episode Show Me on Montana, the 2012 Emily Owens, M.D. episode "Emily and... the Question of Faith", a 2009 episode of House entitled "The Softer Side", and Masters of Sex episode 3 in season 2, "Fight".

Examples of positive representation in television have generally involved recurring characters who have more screen time to develop. The first positive example of an intersex series regular in a TV show was Buba in the 1993 telenovela Renascer. After that, the MTV series Faking It marked the second intersex series regular in a TV show, Lauren Cooper, and also the first intersex character played by an intersex person, Raven. Faking It received positive reviews by intersex activists.

== Recurring intersex characters in television ==
=== Renascer ===
In the original 1993 version of the Brazilian soap opera Renascer, Buba, played by Maria Luísa Mendonça, was an intersex character who got involved with José Inocêncio's children. At the time, the term "hermaphrodite" was used to describe Buba's variation.

In the 2024 remake of Renascer, the character Buba was reimagined as a trans woman, played by Gabriela Medeiros. This change generated controversy, especially within the intersex community, who felt that the representation of intersex people was being made invisible. The author Bruno Luperi explained that the decision to change the character was to broaden the discussion on gender issues and give more visibility to trans experiences. In addition, the plot included an intersex child, Teca's daughter, to address intersex issues from childhood.

=== Faking It ===
In the first 2014 episode of Faking It, "The Morning Aftermath", one of the main characters, Lauren, is revealed to be intersex. Intersex activist Pidgeon Pagonis wrote that Faking It was the first time they and many other intersex people had seen positive representation of intersex people in the media.

=== Serres ===
In 2025, the second season of the prime-time Greek television series Serres revealed that the main cast character Aunt Stamatina is intersex. When she goes to the doctor for abdominal pain, the doctor explains that she is intersex, and that this fact had been concealed from her. She had been subjected to surgery as a baby. She grew up feeling lonely, feeling in the margins of society, and always "in between", but not knowing why. After learning she is intersex, Stamatina is welcomed into the local LGBTQIA+ community.

Series creator Giorgos Kapoutzidis consulted with members of the intersex community when writing the series. This was the first time a character was explicitly called "intersex" in a Greek television production. The episode which revealed Stamatina as intersex trended on Greek social media. Intersex Greece praised the show for depicting an intersex character realistically and with sensitivity.

== Individual drama episodes ==
Many examples of intersex representation in television are one-off episodes. Many are mystery-of-the-week episodes in procedural dramas.

=== All Saints ===
Season 9 of Australian medical drama All Saints included a woman with androgen insensitivity syndrome in an episode entitled "Truth Hurts".

=== Children's Hospital ===
In the 2010 Childrens Hospital episode "Show Me on Montana", Drs. Flame and Maestro try to convince an intersex child which gender to choose, with each doctor vying for their own gender.

=== Emily Owens, M.D. ===
The 2012 Emily Owens, M.D. episode "Emily and... the Question of Faith" featured an intersex baby.

=== Freaks and Geeks ===
In the 2000 Freaks and Geeks episode "The Little Things", Ken has to deal with the discovery that his girlfriend had been born with ambiguous genitalia.

=== Friends ===
The One with the Rumor, season 8 episode 9 sees a rumor spread that Rachel is a "hermaphrodite". ISNA described the episode as "degrading".

=== House ===
In the 2009 episode of House entitled "The Softer Side", a teenager with genetic mosaicism that is unaware of his (the gender his parents choose for him) condition develops dehydration and is admitted to Princeton Plainsboro Teaching Hospital.

=== Janet King ===
In the final episode of the second series of the legal drama Janet King, the character Peta was revealed as both intersex (having AIS) and the killer responsible for the crime that the main characters are investigating. Writing for AfterEllen, reporter Elaine Atwell described the reveal as "offensive", and that the portrayal of intersex people as murderers is "an incredibly destructive and overplayed narrative that encourages people to live in secrecy and shame."

=== Masters of Sex ===
Masters of Sex episode 3 in season 2, "Fight", sees Bill Masters delivers an intersex infant. The circumstances of the infant are used as a plot device for Masters to question the nature of masculinity.

=== The New Normal ===
"The Goldie Rush", episode 12, uses a person born intersex as an object of derision during a flashback sequence of failed dates.

=== Nip/Tuck ===
Nip/Tuck season 3 featured the character Quentin Costa, revealed to be man with 5-alpha-reductase deficiency. It used an intersex variation and plot device of incest that were previously employed in the book Middlesex by Jeffrey Eugenides.

=== Offspring ===
Offspring season 7 has a character revealed to have Mayer–Rokitansky–Küster–Hauser syndrome.

== Documentary episodes ==
Intersex was discussed on British TV for the first time in 1966, and became a topic of interest for broadcast TV and radio in the United States and other countries from 1989.

== See also ==
- Intersex
- Films about intersex
- Intersex characters in fiction
- Literature about intersex
- List of fictional non-binary characters
