= Abigail Tarttelin =

English novelist, actress (born 1987)

- Born: 13 October 1987 (age 39); Grimsby, England
- Occupations: Author, Actress, Presenter
- Known for: Golden Boy; From Below The Balcony
- Website: www.abigailtarttelin.com

Abigail Tarttelin (born 13 October 1987) is an English writer, actress, and podcast presenter.

== Early life ==
Tarttelin was born in Grimsby, Humberside (now North East Lincolnshire). At the age of 16 she trained with the National Youth Theatre, and later the New York Film Academy school in France where she acted in various short films.

== Career ==
=== Film and television ===
Tarttelin's first prominent role was Fenella in The Butterfly Tattoo, adapted from the Philip Pullman novel of the same name. Following this she played the lead in independent sci-fi film Triple Hit (previously titled Schrödinger's Girl) portraying three versions of the same woman in parallel worlds. She also attended the Cannes Film Festival and San Diego Comic-Con with both films. In 2010 she appeared in bilingual thriller Taxi Rider.

Tarttelin has also appeared in the British comedy films, Beyond the Pole starring Stephen Mangan, Acts of Godfrey, starring Simon Callow, Harry Enfield, and Celia Imrie, and award winning independent sci-fi film Whatever Happened to Pete Blaggit?.

As a screenwriter she has worked with Academy Award short film shortlist filmmaker Chris Jones, and wrote the screenplay for the TV pilot The Danelaw which she also directed. Other projects as director include four music videos, two of which were for her own band GIRLBOY, plus trailers for all three of her novels Flick, Golden Boy, and Dead Girls.

Her involvement with Equity saw her elected as Chairperson for the inaugural Young Members' Committee, and in 2016 was a judge for the British Independent Film Awards.

=== Writing ===
Tarttelin's debut novel, Flick, was first published by Beautiful Books in April 2011, then republished in 2015 by W&N. The story follows a disaffected teenage boy named Flick in a small factory town in northern England, where "bleak and sometimes treacherous circumstances make the taste of a love affair even sweeter." It was hailed "a slow-burn cult classic" by GQ who found it "both authentic and compelling"

In 2013, she published her second novel Golden Boy, about an intersex teenager. It has since been published in Chinese, Spanish and Portuguese. It won a 2014 Alex Award from the American Library Association, was one of School Library Journal's best books of 2013, and was shortlisted for the 2014 LAMBDA Award for Best Debut LGBT Fiction. The book has been well received by readers and the film rights are also in discussion.

Her third novel, Dead Girls, was published in 2018. It is set in a small English village and is narrated in first person by eleven-year-old Thera Wilde, who takes matters into her own hands following the sudden disappearance of her best friend.

Tartellin has also published short fiction as well as exceprts from longer, previously unpublished works on her official website, and has two forthcoming novels, Remontada, and Ordinary Woman Turns 30.

Non-fiction publications she has written for include Glamour, The New York Times, The Guardian, The Independent, and Huffpost.

=== Podcasts ===
In 2024 Tarttelin hosted the Arts Council England funded podcast Writing Coercive Control, which she produced in association with Clear Lines Festival. Six episodes were released in which she interviewed six female authors about how they incorporated ideas relating to coercive control in their work.

The following year she began co-presenting From Below the Balcony, a podcast produced by British campaign group Republic, where she interviews vocal republicans, most notably journalists and politicians, from across the British Commonwealth about their experiences with the British Monarchy and reasons for supporting republicanism.

== Personal life ==
Tarttelin identifies as queer.

== Filmography ==
Year	Title	Role	Notes
2006	La Geode	Unnamed female lead	Student short film
2008	Jack Says	Club Waitress	
2008	The Butterfly Tattoo	Fenella	Adapted from the novel by Philip Pullman
2009	Triple Hit	Rebecca/Anastasia/Sarah	Also titled Schrödinger's Girl
2009	Beyond the Pole	Airline Passenger (uncredited)	
2009	Adrift	Maki	Student short film
2010	Taxi Rider	Beverly	Short film
2011	Acts of Godfrey	Beauty Therapist (uncredited)	2011 British Independent Film Awards nominee, "Raindance Award"
2011	Whatever Happened to Pete Blaggit?	Nurse Chéri LeFou	2011 British Independent Film Festival award winner, "Best Feature Film"
2016	The Danelaw	Frankie	TV Pilot, also writer and director
2017	Catcalling Virgin	—N/a	Short film, additional writing

== Bibliography ==
- Flick, London, April 2011. ISBN 978-1907616181
- Golden Boy, London, W&N, 9 May 2013. ISBN 978-0297870944
- Dead Girls, London, Pan MacMillan 03 May 2018. ISBN 978-1509852741

== Recognition and honours ==
In 2009 she was one of two actresses listed in Moviescope magazine's "ones to watch" selection of British artists working in independent film.

Her novel Golden Boy, was described as a "dazzling debut" by Oprah's Book Club. Published in 2013, the book was translated into several languages and placed her on the Evening Standard's 2013 "25 people under 25" list. She is a 2014 recipient of the Alex Awards.
