= Mary Gentle =

British science fiction and fantasy author (born 1956)

- Born: 29 March 1956 (age 70)
- Occupation: Author
- Writing career
- Pen name: Roxanne Morgan
- Genres: Science fiction; fantasy
- Notable awards: Sidewise Award for Alternate History (2000)

Mary Rosalyn Gentle (born 29 March 1956) is a British science fiction and fantasy author.

== Literary career ==
Mary Gentle's first published novel was Hawk in Silver (1977), a young-adult fantasy. She came to prominence with the Orthe duology, which consists of Golden Witchbreed (1983) and Ancient Light (1987).

The novels Rats and Gargoyles (1990), The Architecture of Desire (1991), and Left to His Own Devices (1994), together with several short stories, form a loosely linked series (collected in White Crow in 2003). Gentle's sequence retains some basic facts about her two protagonists Valentine (also known as the White Crow) and Casaubon while changing much else about them, including what world they inhabit. Several take place in an alternate history version of 17th century and later England, where a form of Renaissance Hermetic magic has taken over the role of science. Another, Left To His Own Devices, takes place in a cyberpunk-tinged version of our own near future. The sequence is informed by historically existing ideas about esotericism and alchemy and is rife with obscure allusions to real history and literature.

Grunts! (1992) is a grand guignol parody of mass-market high fantasy novels, with orcs as heroes, murderous halflings, and racist elves.

Gentle formed part of the Midnight Rose collective in the early 1990s.

Ash: A Secret History (published in four volumes in the US) was a long science fantasy epic that won the Sidewise Award for Alternate History in 2000. Gentle has since published Ilario, set in the same timeline.

She has also written a number of erotic novels under the name Roxanne Morgan.

== Bibliography ==
=== Stand-alone novels ===
- A Hawk in Silver. London: Gollancz, 1977. ISBN 0-575-02386-4
- Grunts!. London: Bantam, 1992. ISBN 0-593-01956-3
- 1610: A Sundial in a Grave (vt US A Sundial in a Grave: 1610). London: Gollancz, 2003. ISBN 0-575-07250-4
- The Black Opera (vt UK Black Opera). San Francisco: Night Shade Books, 2012 (paper). ISBN 978-1-59780-219-2

==== Orthe ====
- Golden Witchbreed. London: Gollancz, 1984. ISBN 0-575-03332-0
- Ancient Light. London: Gollancz, 1987. ISBN 0-575-03629-X
- Orthe (omnibus edition). London: Gollancz, 2002 (paper). ISBN 0-575-07287-3

==== White Crow ====
- Rats and Gargoyles. London: Bantam, 1990. ISBN 0-593-01948-2
- The Architecture of Desire. London: Bantam, 1991. ISBN 0-593-01952-0
- Left to His Own Devices. London: Orbit, 1994 (paper). ISBN 1-85723-203-8
- White Crow (omnibus edition). London: Gollancz, 2003 (paper). ISBN 0-575-07519-8

==== First History ====
- Ash: A Secret History (vt US). London: Gollancz, 2000. ISBN 0-575-06900-7 (released in four volumes in the US)
- Ilario, A Story of the First History, released as 'Ilario: The Lion's Eye. London: Gollancz, 2006. ISBN 0-575-07661-5 and as Ilario: The Lion's Eye. New York: EOS, 2007. ISBN 978-0-06-082183-8 and 'Ilario: The Stone Golem. New York: EOS, 2007. ISBN 978-0-06134-498-5 in the US

==== As Roxanne Morgan ====
- Dares. London: X Libris, 1995 (paper). ISBN 0-7515-1341-5
- Bets. London: X Libris, 1997 (paper). ISBN 0-7515-2046-2
- A Game of Masks. London: X Libris, 1999 (paper). ISBN 0-7515-2308-9
- Who Dares, Sins. London: X Libris, 1999 (paper). ISBN 0-7515-2938-9
- Sinner Takes All. London: X Libris, 2000 (paper). ISBN 0-7515-3073-5
- Degrees of Desire. London: X Libris, 2001 (paper). ISBN 0-7515-3087-5
- Maximum Exposure. London: X Libris, 2004 (paper). ISBN 0-7515-3400-5

=== Short fiction ===
==== Collections ====
- Scholars and Soldiers London: Macdonald, 1989. ISBN 0-356-17893-5
- Left to His Own Devices. London: Orbit, 1994 (paper). ISBN 1-85723-203-8
- Cartomancy. London: Gollancz, 2004 (paper). ISBN 0-575-07532-5

Stories

Title	Year	First published	Reprinted/collected	Notes
Under the penitence	2004	Under the penitence. PS Publishing. 2004.		Novella

=== Critical studies and reviews of Gentle's work ===
Lost Burgundy

- Killheffer, Robert K. J. (January 2001). "Books". F&SF. 100 (1): 29–36.

The wild machines

- Killheffer, Robert K. J. (January 2001). "Books". F&SF. 100 (1): 29–36.

== Notes ==
- Ash: A Secret History was published in the US in four paperback volumes:
  - A Secret History: The Book of Ash, #1
  - Carthage Ascendant: The Book of Ash, #2
  - The Wild Machines: The Book of Ash, #3
  - Lost Burgundy: The Book of Ash, #4
- The novella Under the Penitence was incorporated into Ilario: The Lion's Eye. The two Ilario novels were also published (UK 2006) as a single narrative, also called Ilario: The Lion's Eye ISBN 978-0-575-07660-0.
- Left to His Own Devices includes both the novel of the same name, printed for the first time, which forms part of the White Crow sequence, and also a few related and unrelated stories, some of which take place in the Weerde shared universe created by the collective Gentle belonged to, Midnight Rose.
- Cartomancy puts together Gentle's short fiction unrelated to the White Crow sequence, which she included in the White Crow omnibus which also included all of the novels.
