= Annabel (Winter novel) =

2010 novel by Kathleen Winter

- First edition
- Author: Kathleen Winter
- Publisher: House of Anansi Press
- Publication date: 2010
- Pages: 461
- ISBN: 9780887842368

Annabel is a 2010 novel by Canada-based author Kathleen Winter.

== Plot ==
A baby is born in 1968, in "far-from-everywhere" Croydon Harbour, Labrador, Canada. He is intersex – a word unfamiliar to the midwife present at his birth, and to his stoic father and his fanciful mother – with both penis and vagina. His is a masculine world of men who trap for a living, and a father who decided to name him "Wayne" and raise him as male – but his shadow self, Annabel, the name his mother and her best friend Thomasina whisper when they are alone, will live within him for two decades. Wayne heads into the bush with his father, but at home he dreams of synchronized swimming and begs for a sequined bathing suit. He is she, and they are a fluid, pastel contradiction in a rigid, black and white world.

Puberty sets in and there is a medical emergency – Wayne's abdomen fills with menstrual blood. Lost in his superficial world of being a girl, he begins a friendship with classmate Wally. His father, Treadway, begins to question whether Wally is a good influence on Wayne and wants him to be more boyish. Together with his father, Wayne builds a small bridge over a creek. His father thinks of this as a masculine construction project, but the bridge is actually an expression of Wayne's feminine fantasy life. After Wayne ornaments the bridge with curtains and lights, his father dismantles it, interrupting his friendship with Wally.

As Wayne grows into a young adult, he moves to St. John's, where she decides to discontinue her masculinizing medication and allow her body to feminize spontaneously. Ultimately, she learns to accept herself as she really is, reconciles with her father, and renews her friendship with Wally.

== Reception ==
The novel was a shortlisted nominee for the 2010 Scotiabank Giller Prize, the 2010 Rogers Writers' Trust Fiction Prize and the 2010 Governor General's Awards. It held the distinction of being the only novel to make the shortlists of all three awards in 2010. In 2011 it was shortlisted for the 2011 Orange Prize for Fiction, and won the Thomas Head Raddall Award.

In 2014 it was chosen for the Canada Reads competition, where it was championed by actress Sarah Gadon.

Despite critical acclaim, the book has not been welcomed by intersex organizations. Organisation Intersex International Australia described the book as fundamentally flawed and deterministic, based on misconceptions about intersex.

== Adaptations ==
The novel was adapted for BBC Radio by Emma Harding and Miranda Davies.

Singer Alison Goldfrapp of pop duo Goldfrapp wrote a song of the same name inspired by the novel, which features on their 2013 album Tales of Us. Filmmaker Lisa Gunning, who directed the song's music video, has also optioned feature film rights to the novel.
