= Ilario: A Story of the First History =

Duology of fantasy novels by Mary Gentle

First edition (publ. Gollancz)

Ilario, A Story of the First History is a historical fantasy novel by Mary Gentle. It was published as two separate novels in the USA.

== Synopsis ==
Set in the same alternative history medieval world as Gentle's Ash: A Secret History, Ilario, A Story of the First History is more limited in scope. Here, Carthage has become a powerful medieval empire. Protagonist Ilario, is an intersex person seeking to serve as apprentice to a master painter, a path that takes Ilario from Iberia to Carthage, Rome, Venice and Constantinople. Described as "part picaresque, part travelogue, part prose chanson de geste", the story serves to examine issues of gender, sexuality, and power.

== Reception ==
Roz Kaveney, reviewing The Lion's Eye for Time Out described the book as "action-packed, deeply intelligent novel a focus for intrigue, intellectual debate and a fair amount of polymorphous hot sexual action". Strange Horizons found the book "something of a disappointment", with "precious few changes of tone".

== Publications ==
- Ilario: The Lion's Eye. London: Gollancz, 2006. ISBN 0-575-07661-5
- Ilario: The Lion's Eye. New York: EOS, 2007. ISBN 978-0060821838
- Ilario: The Stone Golem. New York: EOS, 2007. ISBN 978-0061344985
