= None of the Above (novel) =

Young adult novel by I. W. Gregorio

- First edition
- Author: I. W. Gregorio
- Language: English
- Genre: Novel, young adult
- Publisher: HarperCollins
- Publication date: April 2015
- Publication place: United States
- Media type: Print (Paperback and Hardback) and E-book
- Pages: 352
- ISBN: 978-0-06-233531-9

None of the Above is a novel by I. W. Gregorio, published in 2015 about an adolescent intersex girl, Kristin, who discovers she has an intersex condition shortly after becoming Homecoming Queen.

== Conception and influences ==
The author, I. W. Gregorio, is a practicing urologist, and the book was inspired by a patient who, like the book's character, has androgen insensitivity syndrome.

== Synopsis ==
Kristin Lattimer is a champion hurdler and homecoming queen who, after a painful first sexual experience, discovers she has an intersex trait, androgen insensitivity syndrome. The book explores the unraveling of her school life, home life and sport life, once her diagnosis is disclosed to her school.

== Reception ==
Kirkus Reviews describes the book as "sensitive and a valuable resource" for teens aged 14–18.

The book was a finalist in the 2015 Lambda Literary Award, in the "LGBT Children's/Young Adult section". None of the Above also appears on the 2016 Rainbow Book List.

== Adaptation ==
The book has been optioned for a TV series by Lifeline.
