= Kathleen Winter =

English-Canadian writer

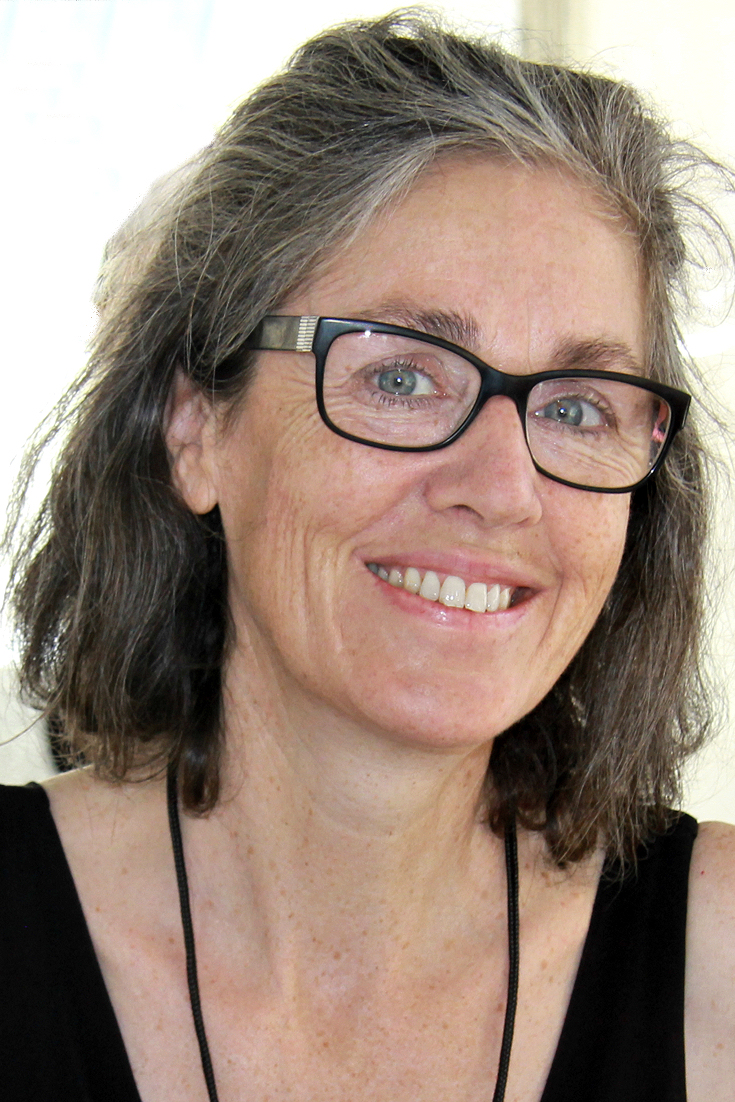
- Winter at the 2014 Texas Book Festival.
- Born: February 25, 1960 (age 66); Bill Quay, England
- Occupations: Novelist, television writer, columnist
- Writing career
- Period: 1980s–present
- Notable work: Annabel

Kathleen Winter (born 1960) is an English Canadian short story writer and novelist.

== Life and career ==
Born in Bill Quay, near Newcastle in the north of England and raised in Newfoundland and Labrador, Winter began her career as a script writer for Sesame Street before becoming a columnist for The Telegram in St. John's. Her debut short story collection, boYs, was published in 2007 and won that year's Winterset Award and Metcalf-Rooke Award.

Her novel Annabel was published in 2010, and won the Thomas Head Raddall Award. It was a shortlisted nominee for the Scotiabank Giller Prize, the Rogers Writers' Trust Fiction Prize and the 2010 Governor General's Awards. It held the distinction of being the only novel to make the short list of all three awards in 2010. In 2011, it was shortlisted for the 2011 Orange Prize for Fiction. In 2014, it was chosen for the Canada Reads competition, where it was championed by actress Sarah Gadon.

A second book of short stories, The Freedom in American Songs, was released in 2014, along with a nonfiction book entitled Boundless: Tracing Land and Dream in a New Northwest Passage. Boundless was a shortlisted nominee for the 2014 Hilary Weston Writers' Trust Prize for Nonfiction.

She was a member of the jury for the 2016 Scotiabank Giller Prize. She was a James Merrill House Fellow December 2015–January 2016.

She lives in Montreal, Quebec, with her husband, Jean. She is also the sister of novelist Michael Winter.

== Works ==
- Where Is Mario? (1987)
- The Road Along the Shore - An Island Shore Journal (1991)
- The Necklace of Occasional Dreams (1996)
- boYs (2007)
- Annabel (2010)
- The Freedom in American Songs (2014)
- Boundless: Tracing Land and Dream in a New Northwest Passage (2014)
- Lost in September (2017)
- Undersong (2022)
