= Both (film) =

2005 American film

- Directed by: Lisset Barcellos
- Written by: Rafael Dumett
- Produced by: Celeste Carrasco; Dana Castro
- Starring: Jackie Parker; Mike Martinez
- Cinematography: Amanda Micheli; Andrew Piccone
- Edited by: Lisset Barcellos
- Release date: 22 June 2005
- Running time: 86 minutes
- Country: USA
- Languages: English, some Spanish
- Budget: $150,000 (estimated)

Both is a 2005 US-Canadian-Peruvian drama film directed by Lisset Barcellos. Starring Jackie Parker, Mike Martinez, Nicole Wilder, Fabrizio Aguilar, Ximena Ameri and Pable Barcellos, the film tells the story of a stunt double with an intersex variation, who discovers her past.

The film was welcomed by members of the intersex community. The world premiere took place at San Francisco's Frameline Film Festival and was welcomed by the Intersex Society of North America.

== Inception ==
An independent film, the story behind Both is based in part on the experience of the filmmaker herself. Talking with the Hartford Courant, Barcellos commented, "I made my film so I don't have to talk about my own experiences".

== Plot ==
Rebeca Duarte (Jackie Parker) is a beautiful and bisexual stunt double, who regularly puts her life at risk in the course of her job. Duarte feels disconnected from her own body, but doesn't understand why that is. Out of the blue, she receives a photo album from a member of her family in Peru. In the photographs she finds her parents and her brother, who died, but she is missing. A telephone call to her mother doesn't explain the story behind the photograph album or her non-appearance. Duarte sets out to discover the mystery.

== Reception ==
SF Gate described this debut film by Lisset Barcellos as "Raw, nervy and groundbreaking", "a brilliant debut" mildly hampered by low production values. The East Bay Express described the movie as an "overlooked gem" and "impressive debut"

The film was well received by intersex community organizations. The Intersex Society of North America described the movie as "a compelling and original indie feature" and "a riveting drama". Both won an audience award at the 28th Créteil International Women's Film Festival.
