= Golden Boy (novel) =

Young adult novel by Abigail Tarttelin

- Author: Abigail Tarttelin
- Language: English
- Genre: Novel, family saga
- Publisher: W&N
- Publication date: May 9, 2013
- Publication place: United Kingdom
- Media type: Print (Paperback and Hardback) and E-book
- Pages: 416
- ISBN: 0297870947
- OCLC: 826526529

Golden Boy is the second novel by Abigail Tarttelin, published in 2013 about an intersex teenager, Max, and his family. It was described as a "dazzling debut" by Oprah's Book Club.

== Conception and influences ==
Tarttelin has described how she explores intersex to look at gender roles, expressing the view that, "I don't particularly think men and women are very different". In discussion with Interview Magazine, Tarttelin comments that gender is arbitrary, but "a lot of it is socially constructed". She is concerned that some mainstream analysis of trans children exhibits a narrow world view and limited expectations of gender roles. Nevertheless, she argues that gender determines "whether you are physically intimidating vs. being physically intimidated". Interviewed at Goodreads, Tarttelin says, "I could explore gender through the eyes of someone who had no need to define themselves as either male or female, but was pressured to do so by their family and community". She deliberately placed her protagonist within an "'average' community and a loving family", saying, "I often feel characters with alternative genders and sexualities are treated as outsiders in art, when in fact they are us, and they belong inside our communities. I wanted Golden Boy to take place in a town that readers could see as their own town".

Tarttelin describes Lianne Simon's Confessions of a Teenage Hermaphrodite, and discussions with gender fluid people on Tumblr, as important influences.

== Synopsis ==
Max Walker is a golden boy: athletic, attractive and intelligent, from a well to do family. A family with secrets, because Max is intersex. When a childhood friend abuses his trust in a horrific way, the family starts to unravel and, ultimately, seek to try to come to terms with its secrets.

== Reception ==
Clare Calvet of the Australian Broadcasting Corporation Nightlife radio program chose Golden Boy as Book of the Week, "Golden Boy" is an amazing coming of age story. Unique. A dramatic, emotional read. And teachers, please read this powerful page turner." Writing in the Austin Chronicle, Jeanne Thornton writes how the "mainstream" character dealing with problems of secrecy, rather than anatomy, is "way better than some meditation on a mysterious shamanistic figure who has lots to teach us all about gender".

Golden Boy has also been well received by intersex audiences. Hida Viloria, director of Intersex Campaign for Equality, describes the book as a "thoroughly engrossing novel with a pioneering perspective ... The novel explores heavy, complex these with a disarming wholesomeness that elicits nostalgia for the novels of adolescence, making it a perfect fit for teen readers as well as adults. Morgan Carpenter at Organisation Intersex International Australia wrote that the story is "realistically and eloquently described"; it "accurately portrays the difficulties in negotiating issues of conformity and autonomy, and the very human need to be true to one’s self" but also, "it’s arguably “intersex lite”, the easily comprehended, mainstream, middle-class introduction to intersex that maybe we need it to be."

== Awards ==
The book was a winner in the 2014 Alex Awards, and one of School Library Journal's best books of 2013.
