= Timeline of intersex history =

The following is a timeline of intersex history.

== Timeline ==
=== Pre-history ===
- Sumerian creation myths, 4000 years ago, include the fashioning of a body with atypical sex characteristics.

=== Antiquity ===
- Hippocrates and Galen view sex as a spectrum between men and women, with "many shades in between, including hermaphrodites, a perfect balance of male and female".
- Aristotle views hermaphrodites as having "doubled or superfluous genitals".

==== 2nd century BCE ====
- Callon of Epidaurus undergoes surgery on ambiguous genitalia, described by Diodorus Siculus.
- Diophantus of Abae socially transitions and joins the army of Alexander Balas.

==== 1st century BCE ====
- Diodorus Siculus describes the god Hermaphroditus, "born of Hermes and Aphrodite", as having "a physical body which is a combination of that of a man and that of a woman"; he also reports that such children born with such traits are seen as prodigies, able to foretell future events.

==== 43 BCE – 17/18 CE ====
- Ovid describes the birth of Hermaphroditus.

==== 23–79 CE ====
- Pliny the Elder describes "those who are born of both sex, whom we call hermaphrodites, at one time androgyni" (andr-, "man", and gyn-, "woman", from the Greek).

==== c. 80–160 CE ====
- Sophist philosopher Favorinus of Arelate is described as being a eunuch (εὐνοῦχος) by birth. Mason and others describe Favorinus as having an intersex trait.

=== Medieval period ===
==== c. 400 CE ====
- Augustine writes in The Literal Meaning of Genesis that humans were created in two sexes, despite "as happens in some births, in the case of what we call androgynes".

==== c. 940 CE ====
- Hywel the Good's laws include a definition on the rights of hermaphrodites.

=== 12th century ===
- According to the canon law Decretum Gratiani, "Whether an hermaphrodite may witness a testament, depends on which sex prevails" (Hermafroditus an ad testamentum adhiberi possit, qualitas sexus incalescentis ostendit).
- Peter Cantor, a French Roman Catholic theologian, when writing about sodomy in the De vitio sodomitico writes "the church allows the hermaphrodite to use the organ by which s/he is most aroused. But should s/he fail with one organ the use of the other can never be permitted and s/he must remain perpetually celibate to avoid any similarity to the role inversion of sodomy, which is detested by God."

==== 1157 ====
- In his Chronicle, or History of the Two Cities, Otto of Friesing described hermaphrodites as "a mistake of nature", "grouped together with other supposed defects of the body, such as short stature, dark 'Ethiopian' skin, and lameness".

==== 1188 ====
- Gerald of Wales in Topography of Ireland states "Also, within our time, a woman was seen attending the court in Connaught, who partook of the nature of both sexes, and was a hermaphrodite."

=== 13th century ===
- Canon lawyer Henry of Segusio argues that a "perfect hermaphrodite" where no sex prevailed should choose their legal gender under oath.
- Henry de Bracton's De Legibus et Consuetudinibus Angliae ("On the Laws and Customs of England", c. 1235) classifies mankind as "male, female, or hermaphrodite", and a "hermaphrodite is classed with male or female according to the predominance of the sexual organs".
- The Hereford Mappa Mundi (c. 1300) includes a hermaphrodite, outside the borders of the world known to its makers.

=== 17th century ===
- English jurist and judge Edward Coke (Lord Coke) writes in his Institutes of the Lawes of England (1628–1644) on laws of succession: "Every heire is either a male, a female, or an hermaphrodite, that is both male and female. And an hermaphrodite (which is also called Androgynus) shall be heire, either as male or female, according to that kind of sexe which doth prevaile." The Institutes are widely held to be a foundation of common law.
- 17th-century historical accounts include Eleno de Céspedes, in Spain.
- Thomas(ine) Hall (born c. 1603) in the United States, is ruled to have a "dual-nature" gender by colonial Virginia governor John Pott.

=== 18th century ===
==== 1755 – after 1792 ====
- Spanish nun Fernanda Fernández is found to have an intersex trait and subsequently reclassified male.

==== 1763/1764 – 1832 ====
- Vietnamese general Lê Văn Duyệt helps to unify Vietnam.

==== 1774 ====
- 17-year-old Rosa Mifsud appears before a Maltese court after petitioning for a change in sex classification from female. Two clinicians perform an examination and found that "the male sex is the dominant one". The petition is appealed and granted.

==== 1792 ====
- Anglo-Welsh philologist William Jones publishes an English translation of Al Sirájiyyah: The Mohammedan Law of Inheritance which details inheritance rights for hermaphrodites in Islam.

==== 1794 ====
- The General State Laws for the Prussian States (Allgemeines Landrecht für die Preußischen Staaten) grants hermaphrodites the right to choose their sex at the age of 18, if the sex of rearing proves to be wrong. It remains in force until 1900 when the Bürgerliches Gesetzbuch becomes effective across the German Empire.

==== c. 1798 ====
- German intersex man Gottlieb Göttlich becomes famous as a travelling medical case.

=== 19th century ===
==== 1843 ====
- Levi Suydam is an intersex person in Connecticut whose capacity to vote in male-only elections is questioned in 1843.

==== 1838–1868 ====
- Herculine Barbin writes memoirs that are later published by Michel Foucault. Barbin was reassigned male against her wishes after clinical and legal examination. Her birthday is marked in Intersex Day of Remembrance on 8 November.

==== 1851 ====
- The Welshman newspaper publishes an account of an intersex child on 7 November.
- During the Victorian era, medical authors introduce the terms "true hermaphrodite" for an individual who has both ovarian and testicular tissue, verified under a microscope; "male pseudo-hermaphrodite" for a person with testicular tissue, but either female or ambiguous sexual anatomy; and "female pseudo-hermaphrodite" for a person with ovarian tissue, but either male or ambiguous sexual anatomy.

=== 20th century ===
==== 1906 ====
- The Cambrian newspaper in Wales publishes an article on the death in Cardiff of an intersex child who, at post-mortem examination, was determined to be a girl.

==== 1908 ====
- Polish gynecologist Franciszek Ludwik Neugebauer publishes a compendium with more than 750 pages of case studies, often with photos, covering the preceding 20 years. This includes surgery performed at the beginning of the 20th century by Emil Zuckerkandl in Vienna.

==== 1915 ====
- The terms 'intersex' for the individual and 'intersexuality' for the phenomenon are coined in the German language by endocrinologist Richard Goldschmidt after studies on gypsy moths. One year later, Goldschmidt uses the term to describe pseudohermaphroditism in humans.

==== 1923 ====
- The term 'intersex' is introduced as the (contested) medical diagnosis Weib intersexuellen Typus ("intersex type woman") by Austrian gynecologist and obstetrician Paul Mathes His book is published after his death, in 1924.

==== 1930 ====
- By 1930, the term 'intersex' had already been widely used in medicine in Germany as a new term for Scheinzwitter (pseudohermaphrodite), and doctors reported numerous different procedures of intersex surgery.

==== 1932 ====
- The German gynecologist and obstetrician Hans Naujoks performs what is described as the first complete and comprehensive intersex surgery and hormone treatment on a patient with both ovarian and testicular tissue, at the University of Marburg. The female patient is described as fully functional after surgery and, starting in 1934, spontaneously menstruates.

==== 1936 ====
- The geneticist and leading German race theorist Fritz Lenz calls for more intersex research, especially on twins.

==== 1943 ====
- Hugo Höllenreiner, an ethnic Sinti detainee in Auschwitz concentration camp, is genitally injured at the age of 9 during medical experiments carried out by Josef Mengele, acts which constitute war crimes. Höllenreiner testifies that he was one of Mengele's many candidates for forced sex change but did not receive full surgery.
- The first suggestion to replace the term 'hermaphrodite' with 'intersex', in medicine, comes from British physician A. P. Cawadias in 1943. This is taken up by other physicians in the United Kingdom during the 1960s.

==== 1944 ====
- The first intersex surgery of a child is performed at the Children's Hospital of the University of Zurich (Kinderspital Zürich). The girl, suffering from congenital adrenal hyperplasia, has her clitoris amputated at the age of seven. She receives hormones in 1951. Between 1944 and 1947, three girls have their clitorises amputated.

==== 1950 ====
- In July, the first mandatory sex verification tests in sports are issued by the International Association of Athletics Federations (IAAF) for woman athletes. All athletes are tested in their own countries.

==== 1952 ====
- John Money is awarded a PhD by Harvard University, entitled Hermaphroditism: An Inquiry into the Nature of a Human Paradox.

==== 1966 ====
- The botched circumcision of David Reimer is followed by sex reassignment surgery in line with theories on optimal gender and gender identity formation by John Money. The case of David Reimer became known as the "John/Joan case" and it does not support early interventions on the bodies of infants who cannot consent.

==== 1968 ====
- Chromosomal sex verification testing in sport is introduced by the International Olympic Committee at the Mexico City Olympics.

==== 1979 ====
- The Family Court of Australia annulls the marriage of an intersex man who was "born a male and had been reared as a male" and subjected to "normalizing" medical interventions, on the basis that he is an hermaphrodite.

==== 1980 ====
- Former Polish Olympic track athlete Stanisława Walasiewicz (Stella Walsh) is killed during an armed robbery in a parking lot in Cleveland, Ohio, on 4 December 1980. She is found to have intersex traits.

==== 1985 ====
- The Androgen Insensitivity Syndrome Support Group Australia (AISSGA) is founded, thought to be the first intersex civil society organization.

==== 1986 ====
- Spanish hurdler Maria José Martínez-Patiño is dismissed from competing after she fails a chromosomal test.

==== 1992 ====
- The IAAF ceases sex screening for all athletes, but retains the option of assessing the sex of participants.

==== 1993 ====
- The Intersex Society of North America (ISNA) is founded by Cheryl Chase and others. Chase announces the organization in a letter to The Sciences. ISNA remains active until 2008.

==== 1996 ====
- The first public demonstration by intersex people, in Boston on October 26. Morgan Holmes, Max Beck and members of the direct action groups Hermaphrodites With Attitude! and The Transexual Menace [sic] demonstrate outside the hotel complex in Boston where the American Academy of Pediatrics is holding its annual conference. The event is now commemorated by Intersex Awareness Day.

==== 1997 ====
- Milton Diamond and Keith Sigmundson publish a paper discrediting John Money and his optimal gender model, after tracking down David Reimer.

==== 1999 ====
- In Sentencia SU-337/99 and then Sentencia T-551/99, the Constitutional Court of Colombia restricts medical interventions on intersex children aged over five years.
- The term endosex is coined as an opposite or antonym to the term intersex, by Heike Bödeker in Germany.

=== 21st century ===
==== 2001 ====
- Indian athlete and swimmer Pratima Gaonkar commits suicide after disclosure and public commentary on a failed sex verification test.

==== 2003 ====
- Australian Alex MacFarlane is believed to be the first person in Australia to obtain a birth certificate recording sex as indeterminate, and the first Australian passport with an 'X' sex marker.

==== 2004 ====
- Intersex Awareness Day is first marked on 26 October.

==== 2005 ====
- In South Africa, the Judicial Matters Amendment Act, 2005 (Act 22 of 2005) amends the Promotion of Equality and Prevention of Unfair Discrimination Act, 2000 (Act 4 of 2000) to include intersex within its definition of sex, due in part to the work of Sally Gross.
- The Human Rights Commission of the City and County of San Francisco publishes the first report on the treatment of intersex people by a human rights institution, entitled A Human Rights Investigation into the Medical "Normalization" of Intersex People.

==== 2006 ====
- Publication of the Yogyakarta Principles on the Application of International Human Rights Law in relation to Sexual Orientation and Gender Identity includes Principle 18 on Protection from Medical Abuses, including "all necessary legislative, administrative and other measures to ensure that no child's body is irreversibly altered by medical procedures in an attempt to impose a gender identity without the full, free and informed consent of the child". Intersex and transgender activist Mauro Cabral is the only intersex signatory to the Principles.
- The medical "Consensus statement on management of intersex disorders" is published, changing clinical language from "intersex" to "disorders of sex development".
- Indian middle-distance runner Santhi Soundarajan wins the silver medal in 800 m at the 2006 Asian Games in Doha, Qatar, then fails a sex verification test and is stripped of her medal.

==== 2009 ====
- South African middle-distance runner Caster Semenya wins the 800 meters at the 2009 World Championships in Athletics in Berlin. After her victory at the 2009 World Championships, it is announced that she has been subjected to sex verification testing, bringing intersex issues to the public eye. On 6 July 2010, the IAAF confirmed that Semenya is cleared to continue competing. The results of the testing are never officially released for privacy reasons and her personal status is unknown.

==== 2010 ====
- In the Kenyan High Court case of Richard Muasya v. the Hon. Attorney General, Muasya is convicted of robbery with violence. The case examines whether or not he has suffered discrimination as a result of being born intersex. He is found to have been subjected to inhuman and degrading treatment while in prison. The Court also determines that he has not suffered from lack of identification documents, but is responsible for registering his own birth, following a failure to do so at the time of his birth.

==== 2011 ====
- Christiane Völling becomes the first intersex person known to have successfully sued for damages in a case brought for non-consensual surgical intervention.
- Tony Briffa, believed to be the world's first intersex mayor, is elected in the City of Hobsons Bay in the suburbs of Melbourne, Australia, at the end of November.
- The first International Intersex Forum is held, in Brussels.

==== 2012 ====
- The Swiss National Advisory Commission Biomedical Ethics publishes a report on the management of differences of sex development.
- On 14 November 2012, the Supreme Court of Chile orders Maule Health Service to pay compensation of 100 million pesos for moral and psychological damages caused to a child, Benjamín, and another 5 million for each of his parents. Born with ambiguous genitalia, doctors surgically removed his testicles without his parents' informed consent, following which he was raised initially as a girl until the age of 10 when tests revealed that he was male. (See also Intersex rights in Chile.)

==== 2013 ====
- On 1 February, Juan E. Méndez, the UN Special Rapporteur on torture and other cruel, inhuman or degrading treatment or punishment, issues a statement condemning non-consensual surgical intervention on intersex people.
- Patrick Fénichel, Stéphane Bermon and other clinicians disclose that four elite female athletes from developing countries were subjected to partial clitoridectomies and gonadectomies (sterilization) after testosterone testing revealed that they had the intersex condition 5-alpha-reductase deficiency.
- In June, Australia passes legislation protecting intersex people from discrimination on grounds of "intersex status".
- In October, the Council of Europe adopts resolution 1952, Children's right to physical integrity.
- Also in October, the Australian Senate becomes the first parliamentary body to publish an inquiry into the involuntary or coerced sterilization of intersex people, entitled Involuntary or coerced sterilisation of intersex people in Australia.
- Intersex activists testify for the first time before the Inter-American Commission on Human Rights.
- Germany passes a law requiring intersex infants who may not be classed as male or female to be assigned as "indeterminate". The move is criticized by civil society organizations and human rights institutions as not based around principles of self-determination.
- In December, participants at the Third International Intersex Forum publish the Malta declaration.

==== 2014 ====
- The High Court of Kenya orders the Kenyan government to issue a birth certificate to a five-year-old child born in 2009 with ambiguous genitalia.
- The World Health Organization and other UN agencies publish a joint statement against coercive sterilization.

==== 2015 ====
- Malta becomes the first country to outlaw non-consensual medical interventions to modify sex anatomy, including that of intersex people. In the same law, it also becomes the first jurisdiction to protect intersex and other people from discrimination on grounds of "sex characteristics".
- The Commissioner for Human Rights of the Council of Europe calls for recognition of a right to not undergo sex affirmation interventions.
- In July, policies on sex verification in sport excluding women with hyperandrogenism are suspended following the case of Dutee Chand v. Athletics Federation of India (AFI) & The International Association of Athletics Federations, in the Court of Arbitration for Sport.
- Michaela Raab successfully sues doctors in Nuremberg, Germany who failed to properly advise her. Doctors stated that they "were only acting according to the norms of the time". On 17 December 2015, the Nuremberg State Court rules that the University of Erlangen-Nuremberg Clinic must pay damages and compensation.
- The Astraea Lesbian Foundation for Justice establishes the first Intersex Human Rights Fund, in an attempt to address resourcing issues.
- The Ugandan Registration of Persons Act 2015 allows for the birth registration of a child born a "hermaphrodite", and for children's change of name and change of sex classification. Many adult intersex persons are understood to be stateless due to historical difficulties in obtaining identification documents.

==== 2016 ====
- In January, the Ministry of Health of Chile orders the suspension of unnecessary normalization treatments for intersex children, including irreversible surgery, until they reach an age when they can make decisions on their own. This is overturned in August 2016.
- In October, the United Nations, African Commission on Human and Peoples' Rights, Inter-American Commission on Human Rights, Council of Europe Commissioner for Human Rights, and other global experts on human rights and child rights call for an urgent end to violence and harmful practices on intersex children and adults.
- In October, the United Nations Office of the High Commissioner for Human Rights launches a website on intersex human rights entitled United Nations for Intersex Awareness.
- Research suggests that there has been no reduction in the number of intersex medical interventions in Germany over the period since 2005.
- Gopi Shankar Madurai becomes the first openly intersex and genderqueer person to contest in an Indian state assembly election for the state of Tamil Nadu. Later, ze became the first openly intersex statutory authority in India.

==== 2017 ====
- The French Senate publishes a second parliamentary inquiry into the wellbeing and rights of intersex people. On 17 March 2017, the president of the Republic, François Hollande, describes medical interventions to make the bodies of intersex children more typically male or female as increasingly considered to be mutilations.
- In March 2017, representatives of Androgen Insensitivity Syndrome Support Group Australia, Intersex Trust Aotearoa New Zealand, and Organisation Intersex International Australia publish an Australian and Aotearoa/New Zealand consensus "Darlington Statement", calling for legal reform, including the criminalization of deferrable intersex medical interventions on children, an end to legal classification of sex, and improved access to peer support.
- Following a European conference in March, the Vienna Statement is published. It calls for an end to human rights violations, and recognition of rights to bodily integrity, physical autonomy and self-determination.
- In April, the fourth International Intersex Forum is held in the Netherlands.
- In May, Amnesty International publishes a report condemning "non-emergency, invasive and irreversible medical treatment with harmful effects" on children born with variations of sex characteristics in Germany and Denmark.
- In June, Joycelyn Elders, David Satcher, and Richard Carmona, three former Surgeons General of the United States, publish a paper calling for a rethink of early genital surgeries on children with intersex traits, stating "Those whose oath or conscience says 'do no harm' should heed the simple fact that, to date, research does not support the practice of cosmetic infant genitoplasty."
- In July, Human Rights Watch and interACT publish a report on medically unnecessary surgeries on intersex children in the U.S., "I Want to Be Like Nature Made Me", based on interviews with intersex persons, families and physicians.
- The U.S. legal case M. C. v. Aaronson is settled out of court.
- The Yogyakarta Principles plus 10 are published, applying international human rights law in relation to sex characteristics, in addition to sexual orientation, gender identity and gender expression. Intersex signatories include Mauro Cabral Grinspan, Morgan Carpenter and Kimberly Zieselman.
- In November, Betsy Driver becomes the first intersex person openly elected to public office in the United States.
- In December, African intersex activists publish a statement setting out local demands.

==== 2018 ====
- In February, Asian intersex activists publish the Statement of Intersex Asia and the Asian Intersex Forum, setting out local demands.
- In April, Latin American and Caribbean intersex activists publish the San José de Costa Rica statement, defining local demands.
- On 15 August, the German cabinet announce a law to create a new sex designation "diverse" in vital records for intersex people who cannot be clearly assigned either male or female at birth. This complies with an Order of the Federal Constitutional Court. LGBT activists say that the law would be failing to make this category available to non-intersex people, and failing to address concerns about medical interventions.
- On 28 August, California becomes the first U.S. state to condemn nonconsensual surgeries on intersex children, in Resolution SCR-110.

==== 2019 ====
- On 1 May, the Court of Arbitration for Sport rejects a challenge by Caster Semenya to IAAF rules requiring the medicalization of women with particular "differences of sex development", high testosterone and androgen sensitivity in sport, paving the way for the new rules to come into effect on 8 May 2019. During the legal challenge by Semenya, the IAAF changes the regulations to exclude from the regulations high testosterone associated with XX sex chromosomes. Semenya appeals the decision to the Federal Supreme Court of Switzerland.
- In May 2019, more than 50 intersex-led organizations sign a multilingual joint statement condemning the introduction of "disorders of sex development" language into the International Classification of Diseases, stating that this causes "harm" and facilitates human rights violations, calling on the World Health Organization to publish clear policy to ensure that intersex medical interventions are "fully compatible with human rights norms".
- In June 2019, a widely signed statement from intersex groups and their allies condemns the positions on intersex issues of the text "'Male and Female He Created Them': Towards a Path of Dialogue on the Question of Gender Theory in Education" by the Congregation for Catholic Education.
- On 22 April 2019, the Madras High Court (Madurai Bench) hands down a landmark judgment and issues a direction to ban sex-selective surgeries on intersex infants based on the works of Gopi Shankar Madurai. On 13 August the Government of Tamil Nadu issues an order to ban sex reassignment surgery on babies and children in the state except in life-threatening situations.

==== 2020 ====
- In July 2020, Lurie Children's Hospital becomes the first hospital in the United States to stop performing medically unnecessary cosmetic surgeries in intersex infants and publicly apologizes to those harmed by past surgeries.
- In October 2020, Boston Children's Hospital announces that they will stop performing clitorplasties and vaginoplasties in intersex infants and will wait until the patient can meaningfully participate in conversations about risks and benefits of the procedure and give consent.

== See also ==
- Intersex in history
- Intersex civil society organizations
- Timeline of LGBT history
