= Suydam =

Suydam is a surname. Notable people with the surname include:

- Arthur Suydam (born 1953), American comic book artist
- James Augustus Suydam (1819–1865), American architect, lawyer and artist
- Levi Suydam (born 1819/1820), American intersex property holder
- Walter Lispenard Suydam (1854–1930), American real estate investor and socialite
- C. Suydam Cutting (1894–1961), American author, naturalist, explorer and philanthropist
