= Alexander Peloplaton =

2nd century Greek rhetorician and Platonist philosopher

Alexander (Ancient Greek: Ἀλέξανδρος), nicknamed Pēloplátōn (Πηλοπλάτων "Clay-Plato"), also known as Alexander of Seleucia and Alexander the Platonic, was a Greek rhetorician and Platonist philosopher of the age of the Antonines and the Second Sophistic.

== Early life ==
He was the son of an elder Alexander of Seleucia in Cilicia (modern Silifke, Turkey). His father was distinguished as a pleader in the courts of justice, by which he acquired considerable property, but he died at an age when his son was too young to care for himself. His place, however, was supplied by his friends, especially by Apollonius of Tyana, who is said to have been in love with Seleucis on account of her extraordinary beauty, in which she was equaled by her son. He spent the property his father had left to him on pleasures, but, says Philostratus, not contemptible pleasures.

== Education ==
Alexander was tutored at first by Aelius Dionysius, but ended the association with his education only half completed. He later finished his studies under the Academic Skeptic philosopher Favorinus, and afterwards was his disciple.

== Career ==
When he had attained the age of manhood, the town of Seleucia, for some reason now unknown, sent Alexander as ambassador to the emperor Antoninus Pius, who is said to have ridiculed the young man for the extravagant care he bestowed on his outward appearance. He spent the greater part of his life away from his native place, at Antiochia, Rome, Tarsus, and traveled through all Egypt, as far as Ethiopia. It seems to have been during his stay at Antiochia that he was appointed Greek secretary to the emperor Marcus Aurelius, who was carrying on a war in Pannonia, around the year 174. On his journey to the emperor he made a short stay at Athens, where he met the celebrated rhetorician Herodes Atticus. He had a rhetorical contest with him in which he not only conquered his famous adversary, but gained his esteem and admiration to such a degree that Herodes honored him with an extremely expensive gift. One Corinthian, however, of the name of Sceptes, when asked what he thought of Alexander, expressed his disappointment by saying that he had found "the clay (Greek: pelos), but not Plato." This saying gave rise to the surname of Peloplaton. The place and time of his death are not known.

Philostratus gives the various statements which he found about these points. Alexander was one of the greatest rhetoricians of his age, and he is especially praised for the sublimity of his style and the boldness of his thoughts; but he is not known to have written anything. An account of his life is given by Philostratus, who has also preserved several of his sayings, and some of the subjects on which he made speeches.

Marcus Aurelius refers to him in his Meditations, as Alexander the Platonic, in a passage recounting good practices the emperor learned from friends:

From Alexander the Platonic, not frequently nor without necessity to say to any one, or to write in a letter, that I have no leisure; nor continually to excuse the neglect of duties required by our relation to those with whom we live, by alleging urgent occupations.

— Marcus Aurelius, Meditations
