= Levi Suydam =

Intersex person

Levi Suydam (born 1819/1820) was a property-holding intersex person who lived in the 19th century. In 1843, at a local election in Salisbury, Connecticut, Suydam was presented to the town selectmen as a male property holder, the requirements for being validated as a voter. This was called into question and he was subjected to repeat examinations and questioning of his sex.

== Background ==
At the time of the election, the 19th Amendment permitting women’s suffrage would not happen for another 76 years. Sex was therefore significant in determining eligibility to vote. Similarly, Connecticut held a requirement that electors own property, until 1845. In a close-fought election campaign, the Whigs sought to register Suydam as a voter.

By this time, medical authority had grown to the point where the medical profession became able to determine the validity of someone's sex. Reis describes how medical discourse during the mid 19th-century typified "the themes of dishonesty and sexual promiscuity lurk in what were otherwise dispassionate and clinical medical cases. Foremost in the narrative is the subject’s shiftiness, as if bodily ambiguity meant that the person’s word also lacked clarity and could not be trusted".

== Medical examinations ==
While there was no question that Suydam owned property, the opposing party raised challenges on grounds that Suydam was more female-looking than male-looking, and therefore ineligible for voting and raising suspicions of fraud.

Suydam was subjected to medical examinations, pronounced male with male genitals, and allowed to vote. The Whigs won the election by a majority of one.

After the election, it was discovered that Suydam menstruated, and he was subjected to further examinations. His other sex characteristics were also called into question, as was his performativity in a male gender role, with suggestions that Suydam leaned towards being a woman. Whether or not the new findings changed the outcome of the election is not established.

== Significance ==
Unlike the earlier colonial Virginia case of Thomas(ine) Hall, the approach to Suydam's situation conforms with earlier legal decisions, where the sex of someone described as a hermaphrodite depends upon their predominant sex.

The physicians performing the medical examination found that gender performance held a relevance in addition to Suydam's anatomical features. They described "his feminine propensities, such as a fondness for gay colors, for pieces of calico, comparing and placing them together, and an aversion for bodily labor, and an inability to perform the same." Legally, the disputed, arbitrary determinations of the doctors held great consequences in that the legitimacy of a vote and the outcome of an election depended entirely on their perspective. The legal and social importance of sex determination was asserted at the time and continues to have consequences to this day.

== See also ==
- Intersex in history
- Timeline of intersex history
