= Fernanda Fernández =

Intersex nun

- Born: 1755; Zújar, Granada, Spain
- Known for: Intersex condition

Fernanda Fernández (Zújar, Granada, 1755 – fl. 1792) was a Spanish nun, found to have an intersex trait following an investigation that Fernández initiated, and subsequently reclassified as male.

== Early life ==
Fernanda Fernández took religious vows and became a nun at the age of eighteen in April 1774. In 1787, she told her confessor that she was developing male genitals, and asked to be removed from the nunnery. She was placed in isolation and became the central figure in an investigation conducted by the church. The archbishop, theologians and physicians were consulted.

== Departing the nunnery ==
After an examination by a certified midwife, Fernández was certified as a male, and was forced to leave the nunnery on January 21, 1792. After more thorough examinations by physicians and midwives, Fernández was confirmed to have a small penis able to produce semen. Fernández was officially stated to be a man 11 February 1792, released from her vows as a nun, and sent back to her parents in Zújar. The case is documented in the Ecclesiastical Curia of Granada.

== See also ==
- Intersex in history
- Timeline of intersex history
- Eleno de Céspedes
