= Gottlieb Göttlich =

Intersex medical research subject

- Born: Marie Rosine Göttlich; March 6, 1798; Nieder Leuba, Holy Roman Empire (Now Germany)
- Died: Unknown, sometime during the 19th century
- Known for: Intersex condition

Gottlieb Göttlich (born Marie Rosine Göttlich, March 6, 1798) was an intersex man in the 1800s who became well known for his condition, as it was the first time many medical practitioners had seen such a case.

== Early life ==
Göttlich was born March 6, 1798, in the Saxon village of Nieder Leuba, then part of the Holy Roman Empire and now Germany. At birth, Göttlich was presumed female and raised as Marie Rosine.

At the age of 33, Göttlich started to have severe pains in her abdominal section, believing the pain to be caused by herniated organs. Professor Friedrich Tiedmann from the University of Heidelberg examined Göttlich in November 1832. Upon examination, he found Göttlich "was evidently a man, with genitals of uncommon formation. She will dress herself, therefore, in men's clothes, and adopt the name of Gottlieb."

== Career as a medical case ==
Göttlich embraced a male identity, and used his unique situation to make a living for himself. He obtained a new passport with a male sex listed and toured across Europe, allowing schools and medical personnel to examine him for a price. Göttlich was examined in the German cities of Bonn, Jena, Marburg, Mainz, Offenbach, Breslau and Breme. In Britain, he exhibited himself in Manchester, Liverpool, Glasgow, Aberdeen, Montrose and Edinburgh. In Ireland, he exhibited himself in Cork and Dublin.

In continuing to travel across Europe, Göttlich reached "fame and fortune" because of his situation. When surgical aid was offered to "correct" his genitalia, Göttlich was “averse to a proposal of this kind, since it would at once deprive him of his... easy and profitable mode of subsistence”. However, this was a reciprocal relationship. Dreger describes how: "in exchange for letting them examine him and publish reports about him, the medical and scientific men gave Göttlich certificates which testifies that his case was of deep interest to the medical man". The investigators built their reputations on such cases.

Göttlich's case has been described as one of a "circus freak" by multiple authors.

Most works refer to Göttlich as a "hermaphrodite", though this term has fallen out of favor in recent years. The term "intersex" for those people with ambiguous or non-conforming genitalia is the modern term.

== In literature ==
Göttlich has appeared in many books, including fiction and non-fiction. Some of these include:

- Middlesex by Jeffrey Eugenides
- Hermaphrodites and the Medical Invention of Sex by Alice Domurat Dreger
- The One-Sex Body on Trial: The Classical and Early Modern Evidence by Professor Helen King
- Hermaphroditismus beim Menschen by Franz Ludwig von Neugebaue
- Dr Handyside's Case of Hermaphrodism by Peter Handyside in The Edinburgh Medical and Surgical Journal, Volume 43, pages 313-318

== See also ==
- Intersex in history
- Timeline of intersex history
