= Favorinus =

Roman sophist and skeptic philosopher (c.80–c.160)

- Born: c. 80 AD; Arelate
- Died: c. 160 AD

Philosophical work
- Era: Hellenistic philosophy
- Region: Western philosophy
- School: Skepticism
- Main interests: Epistemology
- Notable ideas: Damning with faint praise

Favorinus of Arelate (Ancient Greek: Φαβωρῖνος; c. 80 – c. 160 AD) was a Roman sophist and skeptic philosopher who flourished during the reign of Hadrian and the Second Sophistic.

== Early life ==
He was of Gaulish ancestry, born in Arelate (Arles). He received a refined education, first in Gallia Narbonensis and then in Rome, and at an early age began his lifelong travels through Greece, Italy and the East.

== Career ==
Favorinus had extensive knowledge, combined with great oratorical powers, that raised him to eminence both in Athens and in Rome. He lived on close terms with Plutarch, with Herodes Atticus, to whom he bequeathed his library in Rome, with Demetrius the Cynic, Cornelius Fronto, Aulus Gellius, and with the emperor Hadrian. His great rival was Polemon of Smyrna, whom he vigorously attacked in his later years. He knew Greek very well.

After being silenced by Hadrian in an argument in which the sophist might easily have refuted his adversary, Favorinus subsequently explained that it was foolish to criticize the logic of the master of thirty legions. When the Athenians, feigning to share the emperor's displeasure with the sophist, pulled down a statue which they had erected to him, Favorinus remarked that if only Socrates also had had a statue at Athens, he might have been spared the hemlock.

Hadrian banished Favorinus at some point in the 130s, to the island of Chios. Rehabilitated at the ascension of Antoninus Pius in 138, Favorinus returned to Rome, where he resumed his activities as an author and teacher of upper-class pupils. Among his students were Alexander Peloplaton, who would later teach and serve under Marcus Aurelius, and Herodes Atticus, who also taught Marcus Aurelius and to whom Favorinus bequeathed his library. His year of death is unknown, but he appears to have survived into his eighties, and died perhaps around 160 AD.

Favorinus was a friend and mentor of Aulus Gellius, who greatly admired him. He appears multiple times in Gellius' Noctes Atticae, to the point of having been described as the "star" of the work.

Lucian's the Eunuch was probably modeled on Favorinus. Hofeneder and Amato also suggest that Favorinus is identical with the "Celtic philosopher" who explains the image of Ogmios in Lucian's Hercules. Favorinus and Lucian have been grouped together by modern scholars as part of a "group of intellectuals who were of ethnically disparate origins but were endowed with a Hellenistic education and outlook."

== Works ==
Only one work by Favorinus survives, the Corinthian Oration, in which Favorinus complains to the Corinthians for having removed a statue that they had previously erected in his honour, presumably delivered in the aftermath of his disgrace by Hadrian. The oration is preserved in the corpus of Dio Chrysostom as Oration 37, but is nearly universally attributed to Favorinus by modern scholars.

Of the very numerous other works of Favorinus, we possess only a few fragments, preserved by Aulus Gellius, Diogenes Laërtius, Philostratus, Galen, and in the Suda, Pantodape Historia (miscellaneous history) and Apomnemoneumata (memoirs, things remembered). As a philosopher, Favorinus considered himself to be a Skeptic; his most important work in this connection appears to have been the Pyrrhonean Tropes in ten books, in which he endeavours to show that the Pyrrhonist Ten Modes of Aenesidemus were useful to those who intended to practise in the law courts.

Galen devoted to a polemic against Favorinus in De optima doctrina, opposing Favorinus’ thesis that the best instruction consists in the argument in which one speaks, in each particular question, in favour of opposite sides. Galen's treatise says that Favorinus wrote a work On the Academic Disposition also called "Plutarch" and a work against Epictetus named Against Epictetus staging one of Plutarch’s slaves, Onesimus, arguing with Epictetus. Favorinus wrote On the Kataleptic Fantasy in which he is said to have denied the possibility of katalepsis, the key notion of Stoic epistemology.

One of the speeches of Favorinus contains the oldest example of psychomachia, suggesting that he may have invented the allegorical technique, which the Latin poet Prudentius later applied with so much success to the Christian soul resisting various kinds of temptation.

The Suda describes him as a prolific author who composed a large number of philosophical and historical works. It also provides a list of some of his works, which include:

- On Homer's Philosophy (Περὶ τη̂ς ̔Ομήρου φιλοσοφίας)
- On Socrates and His Art of Love (Περὶ Σωκράτους καὶ τη̂ς κατ' αὐτὸν ἐρωτικη̂ς τέχνης)
- On Plato (Περὶ Πλάτωνος)
- On the Way of Life of Philosophers (Περὶ τη̂ς διαίτης τω̂ν φιλοσόφων)
- A collection of maxims

== Personal life ==
Favorinus is described as a eunuch (εὐνοῦχος) by birth. Polemon of Laodicea, writer of a treatise on physiognomy, described Favorinus as "a eunuch born without testicles", beardless and with a high-pitched, thin voice, while Philostratos described him as a hermaphrodite. The Suda describes him as physically androgynous, adding that he was regarded as a hermaphrodite. Mason and others thus describe Favorinus as having an intersex trait. Retief and Cilliers suggest that the descriptions available are consistent with Reifenstein's syndrome (androgen insensitivity syndrome).

Favorinus owned an Indian slave named Autolekythos.

== See also ==
- Intersex in history
- Timeline of intersex history
