= Atticista =

Atticista (i.e. the "Attic-ist) is a surname that can refer to three people in Classical history:

- Aelius Dionysius, Greek rhetorician
- Aelius Moeris, 2nd century Greek grammarian
- Phrynichus Arabius, or Phrynichus Atticista, 2nd-century Greek grammarian
