= Damning with faint praise =

English idiom

Damning with faint praise is an English idiom, expressing oxymoronically that half-hearted or insincere praise may act as oblique criticism or condemnation. In simpler terms, praise is given, but only given as high as mediocrity, which may be interpreted as passive-aggressive.

== History of the term ==
The concept can be found in the work of the Hellenistic sophist and philosopher Favorinus (c. 110 CE) who observed that faint and half-hearted praise was more harmful than loud and persistent abuse.

The explicit phrasing of the modern English idiomatic expression was first published by Alexander Pope in his 1734 poem, "Epistle to Dr Arbuthnot" in Prologue to the Satires.

Damn with faint praise, assent with civil leer,
And without sneering, teach the rest to sneer;
Willing to wound, and yet afraid to strike,
Just hint a fault, and hesitate dislike.

— "Epistle to Dr Arbuthnot" by Alexander Pope (1688–1744)

According to William Shepard Walsh, "There is a faint anticipation in William Wycherley's Double Dealer, "and libels everybody with dull praise," but a closer parallel is in Phineas Fletcher:

When needs he must, yet faintly then he praises,
Somewhat the deed, much more the means he raises:
So marreth what he makes, and praising most, dispraises.

— "The Purple Island" by Phineas Fletcher

The inversion "praising with faint damns" is more modern, though it goes as far back as 1888.

The concept was widely used in literature in the eighteenth century, for example in Tobias Smollett's Roderick Random: "I impart some of mine to her – am mortified at her faint praise".

== Examples ==
- 1917, Lucy Maud Montgomery, The Alpine Path: The Story of My Career:

"They wrote that 'Our readers report that they find some merit in your story, but not enough to warrant its acceptance.'"

- 1940s, Winston Churchill, talking about Clement Attlee:

"A modest man with lots to be modest about."

- 1975, Paul Grice, giving an example of conversational implicature:

A professor is writing a testimonial about a pupil who is a candidate for a philosophy job, and his letter reads as follows: "Dear Sir, Mr. X's command of English is excellent, and his attendance at tutorials has been regular. Yours, etc."

- 2009, interview with Encyclopædia Britannica president Jorge Cauz in the Sydney Morning Herald:

"... [Cauz] said a big problem was that many users considered Wikipedia to be 'fine' or 'good enough.'"

- 2022, an internet meme that began with ironically praising the film Morbius as simply "one of the movies of all time", without any adjective. The quote would serve as a template for any popular culture work judged to be mediocre. See Morbius (film) § Internet memes for additional detail on ironic reception of the film.

== See also ==
- Backhanded compliment
- Curate's egg
- Polite fiction
- Sarcasm

== Sources ==
- Ammer, Christine. (1997). The American Heritage Dictionary of Idioms. New York: Houghton Mifflin Harcourt. ISBN 978-0-395-72774-4; OCLC 228041670
- Browne, William Hardcastle. (1900). Odd Derivations of Words, Phrases, Slang, Synonyms and Proverbs. Philadelphia: Arnold. OCLC 23900443
- Hirsch, Eric Donald Hirsch, Joseph F. Kett and James S. Trefil. (2002). The New Dictionary of Cultural Literacy. Boston: Houghton Mifflin. ISBN 978-0-618-22647-4; ISBN 978-0-9657664-3-2; OCLC 50166721
- Ichikawa, Sanki. (1964). The Kenkyusha Dictionary of Current English Idioms. Tokyo: Kenkyusha. OCLC 5056712
- Pope, Alexander and Henry Walcott Boynton. (1901). The Rape of the Lock. An essay on Man and Epistle to Dr. Arbuthnot. Boston: Houghton, Mifflin Co. OCLC 3147633
- Walsh, William Shepard. (1892). Handy-book of Literary Curiosities. Philadelphia: Lippincott.OCLC 247190584
- __________. (1908). The International Encyclopedia of Prose and Poetical Quotations from the Literature of the World. Toronto: C. Clark. OCLC 22391024
