= Karl Dürrge =

Intersex man

- Born: 1780; Potsdam, Prussia
- Died: 1835 (aged 54–55); Mainz, Grand Duchy of Hesse, German Confederation
- Other names: Maria Dorothea Derrier, Carl Derrier, Carl D’urrgé, Karl Derge, Karl Dörrge, Karl Duerrge
- Occupation: human research subject
- Years active: 1801–1835

Karl Dürrge (also known as Maria Dorothea Derrier: 1780–1835) was a Prussian intersex man, who had been designated on birth documents as female. After discovering the presence of ambiguous external genitalia, Dürrge assumed a male identity and made a living as a medical specimen. Dürrge's life provides insight into the way that persons with intersex variations were treated under the Prussian Code, which allowed such individuals to choose either male or female sex when they came of age. Together with reports of other intersex persons, who allowed their bodies to be used for medical research, Dürrge's case led to the establishment of guidelines for determining sex. Carrying their medical records with them, these intersex individuals helped develop the exchange of medical knowledge between physicians, leading to the application of serial analysis over time to the medical field.

== Early life ==
Dürrge was born in 1780 to a silk worker in Potsdam, which at the time was located in Prussia. In 1801, he was admitted to Charité hospital in Berlin, suffering from a skin condition, possibly scabies. When hospital staff bathed Dürrge, it was discovered that Dürrge's genitalia were atypical. The eminent physician and one-time doctor to Goethe, Christoph Wilhelm Hufeland, made an examination of the patient. Though he noted a phallus-like structure, when Dürrge informed him he had intermittent menstrual cycles, Hufeland concluded the patient was female and that the phallus was an oversized clitoris. He based this diagnosis on the evidence that there was no opening on the tip of the penis and the urethra was located at its base surrounded by the labia majora. Dürrge's case became a sensational story, resulting in the most-noted physicians of the day not only examining him, but writing extensive reports on his genital morphology.

== Controversy ==
=== Background ===
Aristotle postulated that only one sex existed, as women were just "lesser men". Early medical practitioners saw hermaphrodites as a sign of divine power and an illustration of the divine order of the universe. In the 17th and 18th centuries, as science based on empirical evidence and clinical practice challenged medical teachings based on philosophy, a binary sex model emerged. By the 19th century, the idea that the differences in men and women were proven by their different bodies was firmly established. For people with indeterminate biological sex, examination typically resulted in physicians assigning (or reassigning) the category of male or female to intersex people and at times performing "corrective" surgical treatment. Their observation was limited to the testimony of the patient and what was visible on the external body, or what could be determined by feel or through an examination under a microscope. Physicians held to the binary definitions of sex, believing that a "true hermaphrodite" would be able to perform as either sex and procreate. Many believed that "true hermaphroditism" could not exist in humans. In an effort to discover Dürrge's true sex, several physicians examined him, each arriving at different conclusions.

=== Medical and legal examination ===
Christian Ludwig Mursinna, chief of surgery at the Charité hospital's medical school, examined Dürrge and designated him as female based upon the lack of testicles, but noted the characteristics of both sexes. F. F. Monorchis, (which may have been a pseudonym), a pamphleteer, also examined Dürrge at Charité hospital and pronounced that though both male and female characteristics were visible, the fact that Dürrge was unable to sexually perform as either sex and was likely infertile, meant the patient was not a hermaphrodite, but a misshaped woman. Dürrge was next examined by Johann Christian Stark, a professor from the medical faculty at the University of Jena. Answering Stark's questions, Dürrge advised that his bleeding did not emerge from the vagina, but rather as a discharge from the urethra, following an injury. After manipulating Dürrge's phallus to erection, taking account of his testimony that he had experienced ejaculation and erections during sleep, and that he was exclusively sexually attracted to women, Stark concluded Dürrge was masculine.

In 1803, Stark's findings were validated by his colleague at the University of Jena, Franz Heinrich Martens. Privy Councilor, Dr. Johann Friedrich Fritze, who was a member of the Collegium Medico-Chirurgicum, and Surgeon-General Gericke, both from Berlin, counseled Dürrge to wear men's clothing. Gaining physicians' endorsement to live as a man placed intersex people at a legal advantage over women, as it bestowed "all civil rights, freedoms, and responsibilities of the male sex" upon them. Under the provisions of the General State Laws for the Prussian States, passed in 1794, women were subordinate to their husbands and expected to work in the home performing the duties of a wife and mother. Married women, though they no longer had to obey their husbands, had no control over their legal affairs, assets, or property, and husbands could determine if a wife could obtain employment outside the home. Single women or widows could work only in professions prescribed for their social class. Articles 19-24 of the same laws enabled hermaphrodites to choose to live as either male or female from the age of majority.

In line with other intersex people of the period who had been recognized as men, Dürrge began traveling in men's attire, using the name Karl Dürrge (Note: Dürrge's use of a new name was only somewhat successful as it caused confusion at a time when the German language had variable orthography. Many medical reports listed variants of his surname with or without an accented character known as an umlaut; such as Derge, Dörrge, Duerrge, D’urrgé, Dürrge, identifying that he had previously been known as Maria Dorothea Derrier. Other researchers reported that Dürrge was not Derrier, or that all traces of Derrier had disappeared after Fritze and Gericke recommended assuming a masculine appearance.) from around 1807.

== Career ==
Dürrge and other intersex persons of the period, such as Katharina/Karl Hohmann, became traveling medical specimens, exchanging permission to examine their bodies for food and lodging, or money. Out of these examinations, sexing standards, based on the presence of gonads, were established. Traveling intersex specimens also contributed to scientific exchanges between researchers, as they carried their "portfolio" of diagnostic statements with them. Reconstructing Dürrge's travels from the medical reports made, he left Berlin in 1801 and traveled to Jena. In 1802, he moved on to Leipzig, where he was examined by physician and privatdozent, Franz Heinrich Martens. Martens compiled the varying reports which had been created by other physicians and came to the conclusion that the reason they were so different was a result in part of the patient's testimony. Stephanie Sera, a researcher at the University of Duisburg-Essen, points out that physicians did not take into account their own gender biases, which might have been influenced by female attire, a high-pitched voice, and shyness; or male attire and physical characteristics, such as facial hair and male breasts.

In 1803, Dürrge was in Fulda and Prague, where Johann Feiler, a physician and professor of obstetrics and pathology at the Ludwig-Maximilians-Universität München (LMU Munich), announced that Dürrge was offering to be examined by medical students or staff from the University of Prague. After remaining for some time, in 1807 he went to Landshut and began using the name Karl Dürrge. (Note: In the dialect in use in Berlin at this time, Derrier and Dürrge are phonetically similar.) He was examined by Johann Anton Schmidtmüller, a professor of gynaecology at the LMU Munich, explaining that a conclusive medical report was required for a judicial investigation to change his gender marker in official records. In 1809, Dürrge was in Ludwigsburg; and then went to Prague, where he was examined by C. W. Kahlert, district doctor for the police; before moving to Legnica in 1811. In 1816, he returned from Poland to Germany and the following year made a tour that began in Paris, went to London and the Netherlands, and ended in Göttingen.

By 1817, Dürrge was selling molds of his genitalia made from colored wax to earn money. That year he underwent an examination by Georg Steglehner, a prosector in Bamberg, who reported a cystic uterus. In 1820, he met again with Feiler, who compared one of Dürrge's molds to Dürrge's actual body, once again pronouncing him a male. (Note: In his notes, Feiler reported that when the patient pronounced his name, it did not sound like Derrier, Dörje or Dürje, "but rather a mixture of all three names as they would sound in living language" and asked Dürrge to write down his name. He wrote "Dürrge".) The report by Feiler marked the end of Dürrge's career as a traveling medical specimen. He gained employment in 1820 at the University of Bonn and returned to using the surname Derrier. He worked as a wax artist and oversaw the anatomical specimens collection for Franz Mayer, a professor of anatomy. Mayer created presentations and lectures which discussed Dürrge's hermaphroditism.

== Death and legacy ==
Dürrge died in 1835 in Mainz of a stroke. He was autopsied meticulously by Mayer, who first scrutinized Dürrge's portfolio of diagnoses, finding unpublished reports of examinations by Franz Joseph Gall and Friedrich Benjamin Osiander. After providing a synopsis of the various reports, Mayer described in detail his examination of Dürrge from his feet to his head and from his external to internal appearance. Describing and measuring each external feature, and then each bone and organ, he reported finding a penis, prostate, and an atrophied testicle, as well as fallopian tubes, a uterus, vagina and an ovarian-like body near the left fallopian tube. Mayer described the possible ovary as having a texture more similar to an ovary than to a testicle and stated that the structure, which was covered by the peritoneum, "consisted only of granulations and lumps of fat". Mayer's final diagnosis confirmed Dürrge's hermaphroditism, concluding that there were stronger female characteristics.

Dürrge's life is illustrative of how persons presumed to be one sex at birth but later found to have atypical genital morphology had some autonomy through legal codes which allowed them to choose their sex, including what would have been greater rights as men. Observation of Dürrge and other intersex people who traveled allowed an emergence of comparative serial analysis, which had previously not occurred in medicine. Historian Maxilimilian Schochow has called Dürrge a pivotal figure in the changing medical field of the 19th century, which was just beginning to use new techniques to evaluate interrelated parts of the body. By precisely documenting the examination procedures and providing graphic visual representations, physicians attempted to explain the case and importance of their specialized skills, realizing that errors would call their competence into question.
