= Herculine Barbin =

French intersex writer (1838–1868)

Herculine Adélaïde Barbin
- Born: November 8, 1838; Saint-Jean-d'Angély, France
- Died: February, 1868 (aged 29); Paris, France
- Cause of death: Suicide (gas asphyxiation)
- Other names: Abel; Camille
- Notable work: Herculine Barbin: Being the Recently Discovered Memoirs of a Nineteenth-century French Hermaphrodite

Herculine Adélaïde Barbin, later known as Abel Barbin (November 8, 1838 – February 1868), was a French intersex person who was assigned female at birth and raised in a convent, but was later reclassified as male by a court of law, after an affair and physical examination. She is known for her memoir, Herculine Barbin, which was studied by Michel Foucault. Her birthday is marked as Intersex Day of Remembrance.

== Early life ==
Most of what is known about Barbin comes from her later memoirs. Barbin was born in Saint-Jean-d'Angély in France in 1838. She was assigned as female and raised as such; her family named her Alexina. Her family was poor but she gained a charity scholarship to study in the school of an Ursuline convent.

According to her account, she was enamoured of an aristocratic female friend in school. She regarded herself as unattractive but sometimes slipped into her friend's room at night and was sometimes punished for it. Her studies were successful and in 1856, at the age of 17, she was sent to Le Château to study to become a teacher. There, she fell in love with one of her teachers.

== Puberty ==
Although Barbin was in puberty, she had not begun to menstruate and remained flat chested. The hairs on her cheeks and upper lip were noticeable.

In 1857, Barbin received a position as an assistant teacher in a girls' school. She fell in love with another teacher named Sara. Sara's ministrations turned into caresses and they became lovers. Eventually, rumors about their affair began to circulate.

Although in poor health her whole life, Barbin began to suffer excruciating pains. When a doctor examined her, he was shocked and asked that she should be sent away from the school, but she stayed.

Eventually, the devoutly Catholic Barbin confessed to Jean-François-Anne Landriot, the Bishop of La Rochelle. He asked Barbin's permission to break the confessional silence in order to send for a doctor to examine her. When Dr. Chesnet did so in 1860, he discovered that although Barbin had a small vagina, she had a masculine body type, a very small penis, and testicles inside her body. In 19th-century medical terms, she had male pseudohermaphroditism.

== Reassignment as male ==
A later legal decision declared officially that Barbin was male. She left her lover and her job, changed her name to Abel Barbin and was briefly mentioned in the press. She moved to Paris where she lived in poverty and wrote her memoirs, reputedly as a part of therapy. In these memoirs, Barbin would use female pronouns when writing about her life prior to sexual redesignation and male pronouns following the declaration. Nevertheless, Barbin clearly regarded herself as punished, and "disinherited", subject to a "ridiculous inquisition".

In his commentary to Barbin's memoirs, Michel Foucault presented Barbin as an example of the "happy limbo of a non-identity", but whose masculinity marked her from her contemporaries. Morgan Holmes states that Barbin's own writings showed that she saw herself as an "exceptional female", but female nonetheless.

== Death ==
In February 1868, the concierge of Barbin's house in rue de l'École-de-Médecine found her dead in her home. She had died by suicide by inhaling gas from her coal gas stove. The memoirs were found beside her bed.

== Publication of memoirs ==
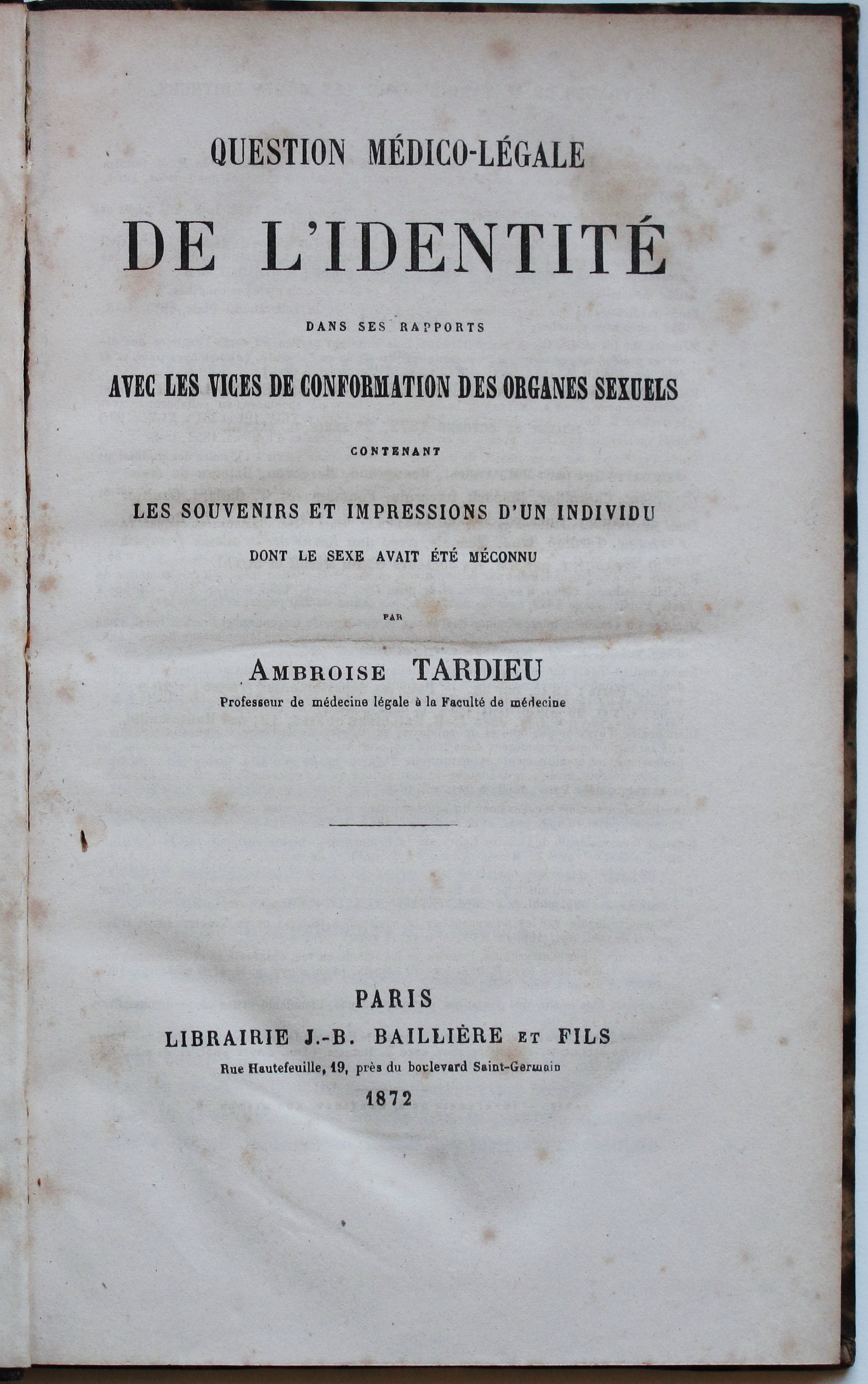
Title page of Ambroise Tardieu's 1872 book in which excerpts of Herculine Barbin's memoirs were first published.

Dr. Regnier reported the death, recovered the memoirs and performed an autopsy. Later he gave the memoirs to Auguste Ambroise Tardieu, who published excerpts as "Histoire et souvenirs d'Alexina B." ("The Story and Memoirs of Alexina B.") in his book Question médico-légale de l'identité dans ses rapport avec les vices de conformation des organes sexuels, contenant les souvenirs et impressions d'un individu dont le sexe avait été méconnu ("Forensics of Identity Involving Deformities of the Sexual Organs, along with the Memoirs and Impressions of an Individual whose Sex was Misidentified") (Paris: J.-B. Ballière et Fils, 1872). The excerpts were translated into English in 1980.

Michel Foucault discovered the memoirs in the 1970s while conducting research at the French Department of Public Hygiene. He had the journals republished as Herculine Barbin: Being the Recently Discovered Memoirs of a Nineteenth-century French Hermaphrodite. In his edition, Foucault also included a set of medical reports, legal documents, and newspaper articles, as well as a short story adaptation by Oscar Panizza.

== Modern commentaries and references ==
According to Morgan Holmes, the anthropologist Gilbert Herdt has identified Barbin as providing a crisis for "modern ideology" through an identification as neither male nor female, but Barbin's own writings describe a self-identification as female, albeit an exceptional female.

Barbin's memoirs inspired the French film The Mystery of Alexina. Jeffrey Eugenides in his book Middlesex treats concurrent themes, as does Virginia Woolf in her book, Orlando: A Biography. Judith Butler refers to Foucault's commentary on Barbin at various points in their 1990 Gender Trouble, including their chapter "Foucault, Herculine, and the Politics of Sexual Discontinuity." There is also evidence to suggest Prince's Camille character and album were based on Barbin.

Barbin appears as a character in the play A Mouthful of Birds by Caryl Churchill and David Lan. Barbin also appears as a character in the play Hidden: A Gender by Kate Bornstein. Herculine, a full-length play based on the memoirs of Barbin, is by Garrett Heater. Kira Obolensky also wrote a two-act stage adaptation entitled The Adventures of Herculina.

In 2014, a manuscript entitled Dear Herculine by Aaron Apps won the 2014 Sawtooth Poetry Prize from Ahsahta Press.

In 2023, the opera "Alexina B." by composer Raquel García-Tomás, inspired by the memoirs of Herculine Barbin, premiered at the Gran Teatre del Liceu in Barcelona. With the premiere García-Tomás became the first female composer to premiere an opera at the Liceu in the 21st century and the second in the history of the theater.

== Commemoration ==
The birthday of Herculine Barbin on 8 November is marked as Intersex Day of Remembrance.

== See also ==
- Intersex people in history
- Intersex rights in France
- Timeline of intersex history
- David Reimer
