= Aelius Dionysius =

2nd-century Greek writer

Aelius Dionysius (Ancient Greek: Αἴλιος Διονύσιος) was a Greek rhetorician from Halicarnassus, who lived in the time of the emperor Hadrian. He was a very skillful musician, and wrote several works on music and its history. It is commonly supposed that he was a descendant of the elder Dionysius of Halicarnassus, author of Roman Antiquities, a history of Rome from its founding to the middle third century BCE. He was one of the teachers of Alexander Peloplaton. Nothing further is known of his life. The following works, which are now lost, are attributed to him by the ancients:

- A dictionary of Attic words (Ἀττικὰ ὀνόματα) in five books, dedicated to one Scymnus. Photius speaks in high terms of its usefulness, and states that Aelius Dionysius himself made two editions of it, the second of which was a great improvement upon the first. Both editions appear to have been extant in the time of Photius. It seems to have been owing to this work that Aelius Dionysius was called sometimes by the surname of Atticista.
- A history of music (Μουσικὴ ἱστορία) in 36 books, with accounts of citharoedi, auletae, and poets of all kinds.
- Ῥυθμικά ὑπομνήματα, in 24 books.
- Μουσικῆς παιδεία ἢ διατριβαί, in 22 books.
- A work in five books on what Plato had said about music in his Πολιτεία.
- Johannes Meursius was of the opinion that this Dionysius was the author of the work Περὶ ἀκλίτων ῥημάτων καὶ ἐγκλινομένων λέξεων, which was published by Aldus Manutius in Venice in 1496, in a volume titled Horti Adonidis; but there is no evidence for this supposition.
