= Curate's egg =

Idiom derived from two late 19th century cartoons

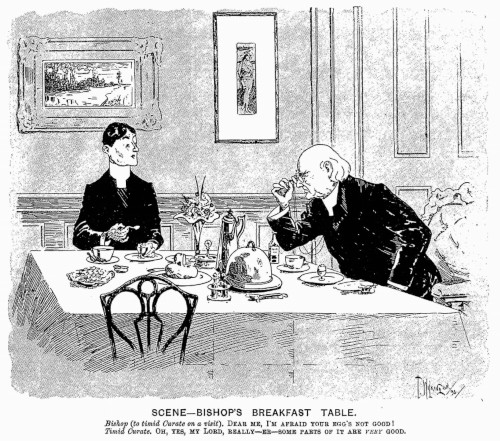
The cartoon by Wilkerson, originally published in Judy, 22 May 1895

A "curate's egg" is something described as partly bad and partly good. In its original usage, it referred to something that is obviously and entirely bad, but is described out of politeness as nonetheless having good features that redeem it. This meaning has been largely supplanted by its less ironic modern usage, which refers to something that is in fact an indeterminate mix of good and bad, possibly with a preponderance of bad qualities.

== History ==
The expression is pre-dated by an anecdote in the 1875 Our Bishops and Deans by the Reverend F. Arnold, referenced in an issue of The Academy: A Weekly Review of Literature, Science, and Art: "Without pledging our credence, we could afford a grin to the story of the 'young Levite' who at a bishop's breakfast-table, was so 'umble as to decline the replacement of a bad egg by a good one with a 'No thank you, my Lord, it's good enough for me'."

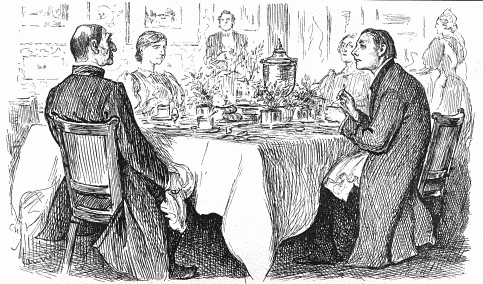
Right Reverend Host: "I'm afraid you've got a bad Egg, Mr Jones!"; The Curate: "Oh no, my Lord, I assure you! Parts of it are excellent!" True Humility by George du Maurier, originally published in Punch, 9 November 1895

In May 1895, the satirical British magazine Judy published a cartoon by artist Wilkerson, showing a timid curate and a fierce-looking bishop at breakfast in the bishop's house. The bishop says, "Dear me, I'm afraid your egg's not good!" The curate, desperate not to offend his host and superior, replies, "Oh, yes, my Lord, really – er – some parts of it are very good." In November that year, the magazine Punch (which had a much wider circulation than Judy) published a similar cartoon by staff illustrator George du Maurier. Titled True Humility, it also pictures a timid-looking curate eating breakfast with his bishop, though in this case with others at the table and servants shown in the background. The bishop says: "I'm afraid you've got a bad egg, Mr Jones." The curate replies: "Oh no, my Lord, I assure you! Parts of it are excellent!" An editor at Judy accused Punch of plagiarism, saying in an editorial, "anyone can see the coincidence for themselves". This version of the gag has become the best known.

For the final issue of Punch's original run, published in 1992, an artist, Tony Hannan, redrew the du Maurier cartoon, with the curate simply saying, "This f***ing egg's bad!"

The Economist's Style Guide of 2018 cites the curate's egg in its entry for the connotations of 'good in parts'. It states: "good in parts is what the curate said about an egg that was wholly bad. He was trying to be polite."

== See also ==
- Damning with faint praise
