= Eleno de Céspedes =

Spanish surgeon and soldier

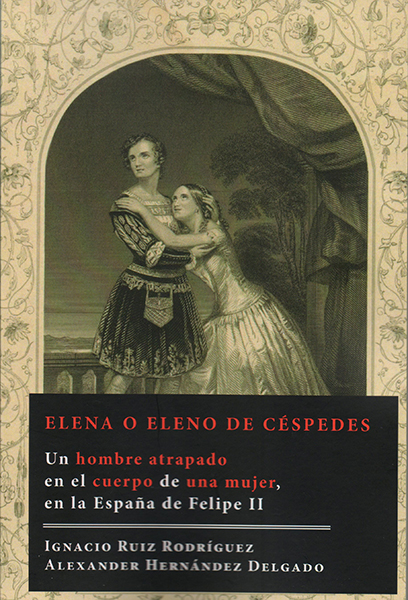
- Biographical essay on Eleno de Cêspedes
- Born: c. 1545; Alhama de Granada, Spain
- Died: Spain
- Military career
- Allegiance: Spanish Empire
- Service years: 1568-1571
- Rank: Soldier
- Conflicts: Rebellion of the Alpujarras

Eleno de Céspedes, also known as Elena de Céspedes (c. 1545 – died after 1588), was an Afro-Spanish surgeon and soldier. (Note: Scholarly literature varies in referring to Céspedes as Eleno, as Elena, interchanging back and forth between the two names, giving both in full e.g. as Eleno/Elena, or combining them as e.g. Eleno(a), Eleno/a, Elena/o, etc.) While Céspedes was assumed to be a female at birth and was initially married to a man, Céspedes later adopted a male identity and served as a soldier during the second Rebellion of the Alpujarras, eventually becoming a surgeon during peace time and marrying a woman.

Céspedes' sex was subject to dispute as a possibly intersex individual, leading to a trial by the Spanish Inquisition on charges of sodomy, witchcraft, transvestism, and bigamy. Céspedes was acquitted of the more serious charges but was sentenced to a ten years of confinement for bigamy, which was commuted to service in a public hospital in acknowledgement of the value of Céspedes' medical skills. After this, Céspedes lived as a successful surgeon and celebrity.

== Early life and first marriage ==
Elena de Céspedes was born around 1545 in Alhama de Granada in Andalusia, Spain. Céspedes was mulatta, born from an enslaved black Muslim woman named Francisca de Medina and a free, Christian, Castilian peasant named Pero Hernández. Born into slavery, and branded on the cheeks as the offspring of a slave, Céspedes was freed as a child, and took the surname of a former owner's wife. Céspedes married a stonemason named Cristóbal Lombardo at age fifteen or sixteen. Within a few months, while Céspedes was pregnant with his child, Lombardo left because the two did not get along. According to Céspedes, Lombardo died some time later.

Céspedes said that an intersex condition became apparent while giving birth, (Note: According to Delgado & Saens (2000), Michèle Escamilla alternatively says it was in Sanlúcar de Barrameda, where Céspedes moved at age 20, that "she discovered her double sexuality".) and after giving birth, Céspedes left the baby boy (named Cristóbal after his father) with a friend and began to travel around Spain, working in various professions including as a tailor. After a fight during which Céspedes stabbed a pimp (and was jailed for a time), Céspedes began to wear men's instead of women's clothing, use the masculine name Eleno, and openly court women.

== Military career ==
Céspedes then found work as a farmhand and shepherd, but was turned in to the corregidor by an acquaintance. Céspedes was arrested, with release conditional on Céspedes dressing as a woman. Undeterred after release, Céspedes resumed dressing as a man. With the outbreak of the Rebellion of the Alpujarras of 1568, Céspedes enlisted as a soldier during his stay at Arcos de la Frontera, joining the company of Luis Cristóbal Ponce de León, Duke of Arcos. Céspedes likely did so to escape a social scandal, having seduced the sister of a priest for whom he worked. He enrolled under the surname "Céspedes", without a first name, to better conceal his identity. He served for an entire campaign, after which he returned and settled in Jerez de la Frontera. There, he passed the examination for the official tailors' guild while presenting as a woman, only to subsequently establish himself as a male tailor.

As the rebellion intensified, Céspedes enlisted once more, either out of a love for adventure or because local residents had begun to catch wind of his true identity. This time he served impersonating a neighbor who had paid him a sum of money to take his place in the levy. He again served in the company of the Duke of Arcos, who deployed troops to the mountainous region of Ronda, an area notorious for Moorish ambushes and frequently targeted by Spanish raids. He remained in service until the end of the war, which concluded in 1571 when the final group of Moriscos surrendered to the army, then commanded by John of Austria. Céspedes, who was literate, then purchased several books on surgery and medicine, and with these and the help of a Valencian surgeon Céspedes had befriended during the war, trained to become a surgeon in Madrid.

== Second marriage, arrest, and trial ==
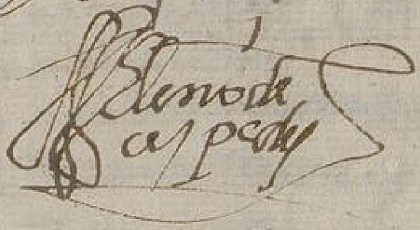
The signature of Eleno de Céspedes on an Inquisition trial document.

In December 1584, Céspedes and a woman named María del Caño, the daughter of an artisan, applied to marry. Because Céspedes lacked facial hair, the vicar of Madrid, Juan Baptista Neroni, questioned if Céspedes was a eunuch; at either Céspedes's or Neroni's request, four men (including a doctor) examined Céspedes (from the front only) in Yepes and attested to the presence of male genitalia and that Céspedes was not a eunuch, whereupon Céspedes and Caño were given a license to marry.

After the banns were announced, however, two townspeople told the priest Céspedes was "male and female", with genitalia of both sexes. Subsequently the priest refused to perform the marriage, and Neroni arranged for a second examination to be performed by Francisco Díaz (Philip II's doctor and a noted urologist) and Madrid doctor Antonio Mantilla on 17 February 1586. They reported Céspedes had a normal penis and testicles, as well as a crease and aperture between them and the anus (which might indicate a vagina). In 1586, when Céspedes was forty and Caño was twenty-four, the couple were finally married; they lived together in Yepes in the vicinity of Toledo, Spain for a year. (Note: [De Céspedes] was a woman, a hermaphrodite, a man, a wife, a husband, a slave, a freed slave, a weaver, a draper, a shepherd, a domestic servant, a soldier and a surgeon. Garcia (2015).)

In June 1587, acting on a neighbor's accusation, the couple were arrested, charged with "sodomy", and imprisoned in the municipal jail in Ocaña, Spain. On 4 July 1587, the bailiff formally accused Céspedes of (besides sodomy) pretending to be a man, using witchcraft to appear as a man to earlier medical examiners, engaging in transvestism and, by marrying a woman, mocking the sanctity of marriage. Céspedes argued that, because he had a penis when he married Caño, the marriage was legitimate. The bailiff asked the vicar general to punish the couple severely; the penalty for female homosexuality was death. However, the Toledo tribunal of the Spanish Inquisition ordered the secular and episcopal authorities to turn the case over to them, because the charge of witchcraft was within the Inquisition's jurisdiction; the couple were therefore transferred to an Inquisition jail in Toledo.

Inquisitors focused on Céspedes's claim to be, in the parlance of the time, a hermaphrodite; Céspedes argued this state made both marriages licit, as Céspedes had been a woman during the first marriage and then had had sexual intercourse with men, and it was only after a male organ appeared when Céspedes gave birth that Céspedes went on to have intercourse with women and marry Caño. Céspedes argued this natural (intersex/hermaphroditic) condition also made the witchcraft charge, of having the devil's aid in appearing as a man or woman, unfounded. Céspedes said the penis-like organ first emerged after childbirth, became engorged when aroused, and retracted inside. Céspedes said this organ was initially curved downward by skin, but a surgeon was able to successfully sever this skin.

Thereafter, Céspedes claimed to urinate via the penis and usually ejaculated, and gave the names of previous partners who could attest to Céspedes sex; during the trial, several doctors, female lovers, and male friends testified they had viewed Céspedes as a man. In turn, midwives who examined and penetrated what they interpreted as Céspedes's vagina with a candle and fingers found it so tight and resistant to penetration that they concluded Céspedes was not only female but a virgin. (Note: Ramet (ed.) (2002), ch. 7 adds that the midwives said Caño was "wide and roomy", i.e. non-virginal.) To explain the lack of visible evidence of a penis, Céspedes said it had been injured and amputated shortly before imprisonment, following a riding injury. The Inquisition also ordered Francisco Díaz to perform a second examination; this time, Díaz found only female genitalia, but maintained he had seen male genitals during his earlier examination.

Many of the physical signs inquisitors focused on were also racial; they noted, for example, that Céspedes had no facial hair and had pierced ears, like a (Castilian) woman; Lisa Vollendorf says that Caño is not recorded as indicating whether she thought, for example, that mulattoes might have less facial hair than Castilians or that enslaved people often pierced their ears. Inquisitors also argued Caño should have noticed when Céspedes menstruated, which Céspedes said occurred though always with an infrequent cycle; Caño said that after seeing blood on Céspedes' nightshirt, Céspedes told her it was from bleeding (of hemorrhoids or wounds) caused by horseback riding.

== Verdict and sentence ==
The medical examiners at Toledo said Céspedes was and had always been female, but the tribunal declined to rule on the "legally messy" charges set forth by the prosecutor related to that, like sodomy or witchcraft, and convicted Céspedes only of bigamy, for failing to adequately document Lombardo's death before marrying Caño. It imposed the standard sentence imposed on male bigamists in that era, 200 lashes and ten years of confinement. Céspedes was also subjected to a public humiliation, an auto-da-fé, being paraded around Toledo's central square in a sanbenito mitre and robes.

On account of his medical skills, Céspedes was ordered to spend his ten-year sentence caring for the poor in a public hospital, initially the Hospital del Rey in Toledo. However, many people came to see and be healed by the now well-known Céspedes, so on 23 February 1589 the administrator there requested Céspedes be transferred to a more remote facility, saying his presence was causing an "annoyance and embarrassment". The tribunal exonerated Caño of knowingly doing anything wrong, and released her.

== Sex, gender, and sexuality ==
Various historical and medical studies of Céspedes's case have attempted to classify the Spaniard as intersex, as transsexual, or as a hypospadic male; other authors have viewed Céspedes as a lesbian woman (who may have adopted male clothes to acquire more social freedom), as transgender (perhaps a trans man whose claims of being a "hermaphrodite" were attempts to explain his gender dysphoria without a specific word for it), or as non-binary, defying a binary model of gender and sex. Lisa Vollendorf says that while "even when medical doctors provided contradictory evidence, the Inquisition maintained that sex was an indisputable material fact" (displaying, she says, "an almost fetishistic interest in Céspedes's genitalia"), Céspedes described not only his physiology but also gave "behavioral and psychological explanations for his masculinity" he had lived for decades, and drew on his knowledge of medicine and history and cited Aristotle, Augustine, Cicero, and Pliny in arguing that his intersex body was not "unnatural or unprecedented". Most information about Céspedes stems from the trial, and testimony during it. If a woman, Céspedes would be the first known female surgeon in Spain and perhaps Europe.

During the trial, inquisitorial scribes inconsistently used both masculine and feminine pronouns to refer to Céspedes, while in his own testimony he consistently described himself with masculine terms.

== See also ==
- Catalina de Erauso (1585–1650), Spanish nun and conquistador
- Fernanda Fernández (1755–fl. 1792), Spanish intersex nun
