= Thomas(ine) Hall =

English servant

- Born: Thomasine Hall; 1603; Newcastle upon Tyne, England
- Died: Unknown

Thomas Hall, born Thomasine Hall, was an English intersex soldier and became an indentured servant after immigrating to colonial Virginia. Hall wore both masculine and feminine garments, and behaved according to the gender expectations of each manner of dress. Hall and "Great Besse", a fellow servant in Warrosquyoake, had a sexual liaison which was made known to the town in 1629. The case concerning Hall's gender was sent to the Quarter Court in Jamestown, which ruled that Hall was to present in public as both masculine and feminine. The court defined Hall as both a man and a woman.

Hall's given name is typically written as "Thomas(ine)" or "Thomas/ine" in scholarly literature on the case.

== Early life ==
Hall was born and christened Thomasine Hall at All Saints' Church, Newcastle upon Tyne in England. Hall was raised as a girl and performed traditional women's crafts, such as needlework. At the age of twelve, Hall was sent to London to live with an aunt. Hall lived there for ten years and observed the popularity among the aristocracy of crossover male and female fashion. Hall also had ample opportunity to engage with the emerging feminine street-culture. These trends may have influenced Hall to break away from social norms.

At the age of twenty-four (in the year 1625), Hall adopted a masculine gender presentation in order to follow Hall's brother into the military. Hall served in the English military at the Isle of Rhe, France, in 1627. This campaign ended with almost half of Hall's fellow soldiers dead, or left behind in France. Hall returned to the port of Plymouth before the end of the year, and earned a living for a time by making bone lace and creating other needleworks. From the Plymouth port, Hall presented as a man and traveled by ship to the Chesapeake bay. Hall was settled in Jamestown as an indentured servant by December 1627.

== Resettlement ==
Once in Virginia, Hall likely lived with Jane and John Tyos. It is not known for certain whether this is the same Thomas Hall. However, in a court case determining whether or not the Tyoses and Thomas Hall were in possession of stolen goods, Thomas Hall reported that Jane Tyos asked for Hall to sew a pouch to transport the goods. This confession announced to the courts that a woman asked her masculine indentured servant to sew, which subverted expected gender roles. While it is unconfirmed whether this Thomas Hall is Thomas(ine) Hall, this detail makes such an interpretation plausible. At some point after this, Hall "adopted a female persona" and moved to the small settlement at Warrosquyoacke, Virginia, a village of fewer than 200 people. It had been founded on the site of an Algonquin village along the James River, and was home to two tobacco plantations. Hall worked as a maidservant at John Atkins' plantation in 1628 and 1629.

== Sex, sexuality, and gender queries ==
On 12 February 1628/9, Alice Longe, Dorothy Rodes and Barbara Hall conducted a surreptitious genital examination on a sleeping Thomas(ine) Hall at the Atkins plantation in an attempt to resolve uncertainty about Hall's sex. After this inspection failed to produce consensus, Hall openly allowed five women, including the three from the previous incident, along with John Atkins, to investigate Hall's genitalia again. Atkins, being the highest authority, decided that Hall's genitalia could only represent a man and ordered Hall to present as a man.

Even after this declaration, Hall was asked by Captain Nathanial Basse about Hall's feminine clothing, and Hall continued to declare gender ambiguity. Following this, members of the town harassed and assaulted Hall in multiple attempts to see for themselves which sex Hall's gender should reflect. Despite these attempts, the townspeople could not find a conclusive consensus on Hall's gender or sex. Stories spread that Hall had sexual relations with the maid nicknamed "Great Besse", who worked for the former governor of Virginia, Richard Bennett. Hall accused Alice Longe of starting this rumour, though Longe blamed an unnamed servant of Jane and John Tyos. Hall's biological sex was thus an issue of criminal responsibility; as a male, Hall could be prosecuted for sexual misconduct with a servant.

== The General Court ==
Now that Hall had reportedly slept with a woman, the question of Hall's gender and consequent sexuality became a social and legal matter. On April 8th 1629, the townspeople brought Hall to the General Court without charges for a case that would determine if Hall could be charged with fornication or "unnatural" sex.

In the proceedings Hall explicitly identifies as both a man and a woman, and there are two witnesses who corroborate that Hall cross-dressed and had "gender-crossing" genitalia. The witnesses, John Atkins and Francis England, not only personally participated in investigating Hall's genitalia, but recounted the numerous attempts by townspeople. England told the court that he had overheard Hall claiming to be dressed as a woman "to get a bitt for my catt". Gordon Williams' dictionary reveals that "catt" can mean prostitution or lascivious behavior and "bitt" can mean male or female genitalia. Williams also elaborates that when they are used together, they definitively indicate sexual behavior and want. The gender ambiguity of this statement for both Hall and any potential partners represents one aspect of Hall's consistent attention to gender presentation. Under the threat of death, Hall was expected to pick a gender presentation and stick to it. When Hall refused to identify as one or the other and instead continued to identify as both, the court accepted this decision, with the provision that Hall was to make this clear in gender presentation.

The court documents reveal that there was a notice sent to the plantation in Warrosquyoacke which declared that Hall was both "a man and a woeman". This ruling brought with it a mandate for Hall to wear men's clothing with a coif and apron. It was a ruling that proved the exception to the rule and should not be interpreted as a kindness or understanding of Hall's choices, but as an attempt at categorizing what the townspeople and court could not feasibly conclude. By enforcing this clear dual gender expression upon Hall, the court and townspeople ostracized Hall from social gatherings and gendered experiences. This punishment would also prevent Hall from engaging in sexual relations with the townspeople. Hall was also ordered to post bond until the court decided that his/her good behavior merited a release.

Nothing further is known about Hall's life or about how long the dual-sexed clothing rule was applied. (Note: Further court records have not survived. The goods of a recently deceased Thomas Hall are recorded as being disposed of in early 1633. Another Thomas Hall appears to have been living in the vicinity in the 1640s. There is no way of knowing whether either of them are the Hall recorded in this case.)

== Context and legacy ==
In the early modern era common people would have been familiar with the concept of hermaphroditism. Medical journals and books often had at least one chapter dedicated to the topic. In combination with the pervasive spectrums of Galenic medicine there were many interpretations of hermaphrodites in the early 18th century. Due to the spectrum of sexual markers, gender presentation was often the lens through which sex was determined. Early modern medicine upkept an aristocratic and elite view on the fluidity of sexual markers as indicators of sex and gender. Despite this fluid aspect of sex and gender being understood in the legal and social spheres an Aristotelian model of differentiation prevailed.

The 12th-century Decretum Gratiani states that "Whether an hermaphrodite may witness a testament, depends on which sex prevails", while Henry de Bracton's De Legibus et Consuetudinibus Angliae ("On the Laws and Customs of England"), c. 1235, states that "A hermaphrodite is classed with male or female according to the predominance of the sexual organs." The Lawes Resolutions of Womens Rights (1632) approaches how one is to attempt to legally categorize hermaphrodites in a world where men and women are afforded different rights and roles. Civil and canon European law eventually came to adopt the same policy as outlined in the Roman Lex Repetundarum. This stated that hermaphrodites are legally, and likely socially, interacted with based upon dominating sexual characteristics. Legally hermaphrodites could only exist as the perceived dominating gender.

Colonists would have taken this frame of reference with them and altered it upon meeting and observing the indigenous peoples of North America. The Algonquin's living in the Virginia colony had different gender roles and expectations than European's would have been familiar with. Women's and men's roles were interpreted to rule out egalitarian separation and insist upon a womanly inferiority. Colonists interpretations allowed for reconstruction of gender based on performative tasks and presentation. Clothing was an integral aspect of identifying a person's gender and class status.

Reis states that the novel solution required by the court was a deliberate form of unjust punishment, "not to endorse uncertainty, but to preclude future acts of deception, to mark the offender, and to warn others against similar abomination. Dual-sexed Hall embodied a category of sex considered impermissible at that time." She states that making Hall a public spectacle would have been devastating and limiting of Hall's personhood, and this radical act contradicts not only earlier legal accounts, but also later legal and medical responses to the state of being intersex.

== See also ==
- Intersex in history
- Timeline of intersex history
- Intersex people and military service
