= Intersex Day of Remembrance =

Annual observance

- Also called: Intersex Solidarity Day
- Observed by: Intersex community
- Type: International
- Date: November 8
- Next time: November 8, 2027
- Frequency: annual
- First time: November 8, 2005
- Related to: Intersex Awareness Day

Intersex Day of Remembrance, also known as Intersex Solidarity Day, is an internationally observed civil awareness day designed to highlight issues faced by intersex people. It marks the birthday of Herculine Barbin, a French intersex person whose memoirs were later published by Michel Foucault in Herculine Barbin: Being the Recently Discovered Memoirs of a Nineteenth-century French Hermaphrodite.

== History ==
The event appears to have begun on November 8, 2005, as Intersex Solidarity Day, following an invitation issued by Joëlle-Circé Laramée, then Canadian spokeswoman for Organisation Intersex International. The Organisation invited organisations and groups and individuals to show solidarity by marking the life of Herculine Barbin, or discussing intersex genital mutilation, "the violence of the binary sex and gender system" and/or "the sexism implicit within the binary construct of sex and gender".

== Observance ==
While Intersex Awareness Day on October 26 appears to be celebrated more in English-speaking countries, particularly in North America, Intersex Day of Remembrance has been marked mostly in Europe. Some countries, such as Australia and South Africa, mark both events and the days between as "14 days of intersex".

== Notable observances ==
In 2012, the New South Wales Parliament acknowledged the day. Linda Burney, a Member of the Legislative Assembly, also commended Organisation Intersex International Australia as part of a motion noting the day.

In 2014, Literaturhaus Salzburg, Austria, was the venue for an Intersex Solidarity Day event. A similar event was held at University of Salzburg in 2013. On Intersex Solidarity Day 2016, OII Europe launched a new visibility website, InterVisibility.eu, with material on intersex in 23 European languages.

== See also ==
- Intersex human rights
