= Madonna–whore complex =

Mental complex revolving around negative views of female sexuality

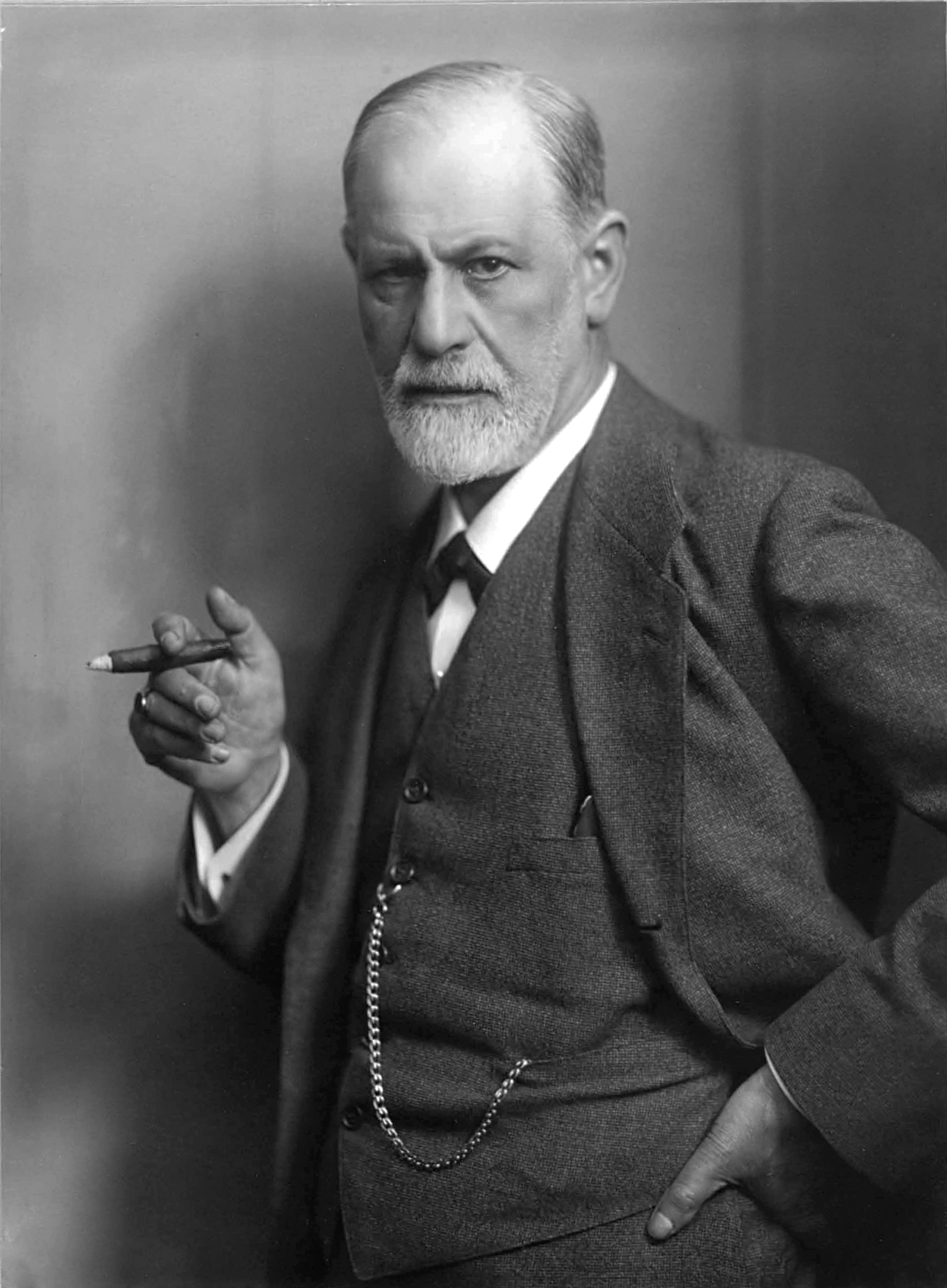
Sigmund Freud, who identified the complex

A Madonna–whore complex (also called a Madonna–mistress complex) is a psychological phenomenon first observed in psychoanalysis, and later applied to feminist critique of broader society. In psychoanalysis, the complex is defined as an inability to maintain sexual arousal within a committed and loving relationship. First identified by Sigmund Freud, who called it psychic impotence, it is a psychological complex that is said to develop in men who see women as either saintly Madonnas or debased whores. Men with this complex desire a sexual partner who has been degraded (whore) while they cannot desire the respected partner (Madonna). Freud wrote, "Where such men love they have no desire, and where they desire they cannot love." Clinical psychologist Uwe Hartmann wrote in 2009 that the complex "is still highly prevalent in today's patients."

== In psychoanalysis ==
Freud argued that the Madonna–whore complex was caused by a split between the affectionate and the sexual currents in male desire. Oedipal and castration anxiety fears prohibit the affection felt for past incestuous objects from being attached to women who are sensually desired: "The whole sphere of love in such persons remains divided in the two directions personified in art as sacred and profane (or animal) love". In order to minimize anxiety, the man categorizes women into two groups: women he can admire and women he finds sexually attractive. Whereas the man loves women in the former category, he despises and devalues the latter group. Psychoanalyst Richard Tuch suggests that Freud offered at least one alternative explanation for the Madonna–whore complex:

This earlier theory is based not on oedipal-based castration anxiety but on man's primary hatred of women, stimulated by the child's sense that he had been made to experience intolerable frustration and/or narcissistic injury at the hands of his mother. According to this theory, in adulthood, the boy-turned-man seeks to avenge these mistreatments through sadistic attacks on women who are stand-ins for the mother.

Such a split may be exacerbated when the sufferer is raised by a cold but overprotective mother, with the lack of emotional nurturing paradoxically strengthening an incestuous tie. Such a man will often court someone with maternal qualities, hoping to fulfill a need for maternal intimacy unmet in childhood, only for a return of the repressed feelings surrounding the earlier relationship to prevent sexual satisfaction in the new.

Another theory claims that the Madonna–whore complex derives from the alleged representations of women as either madonnas or whores in mythology and Abrahamic theology, rather than deriving from developmental disabilities of individual men.

== Feminist interpretations ==
Feminist theory asserts that the male-dominated culture perpetuates patriarchal norms by controlling women's sexual autonomy through shaming, reinforcing gender stereotypes, and allowing men to maintain power. Sexual script theory, as discussed by sociologists William Simon and John Gagnon, suggests that these scripts are primarily authored by heterosexual males, portraying men as sexual pursuers favoring casual sex and women as gatekeepers favoring relational sex. This limits women's sexual autonomy as assertiveness risks slut-shaming and being seen as unfit partners. Researchers Emily Kane and Mimi Schippers argue that assertive female sexuality threatens male social dominance, as men may fear manipulation, reducing female autonomy to preserve their power.

== Cultural representations ==
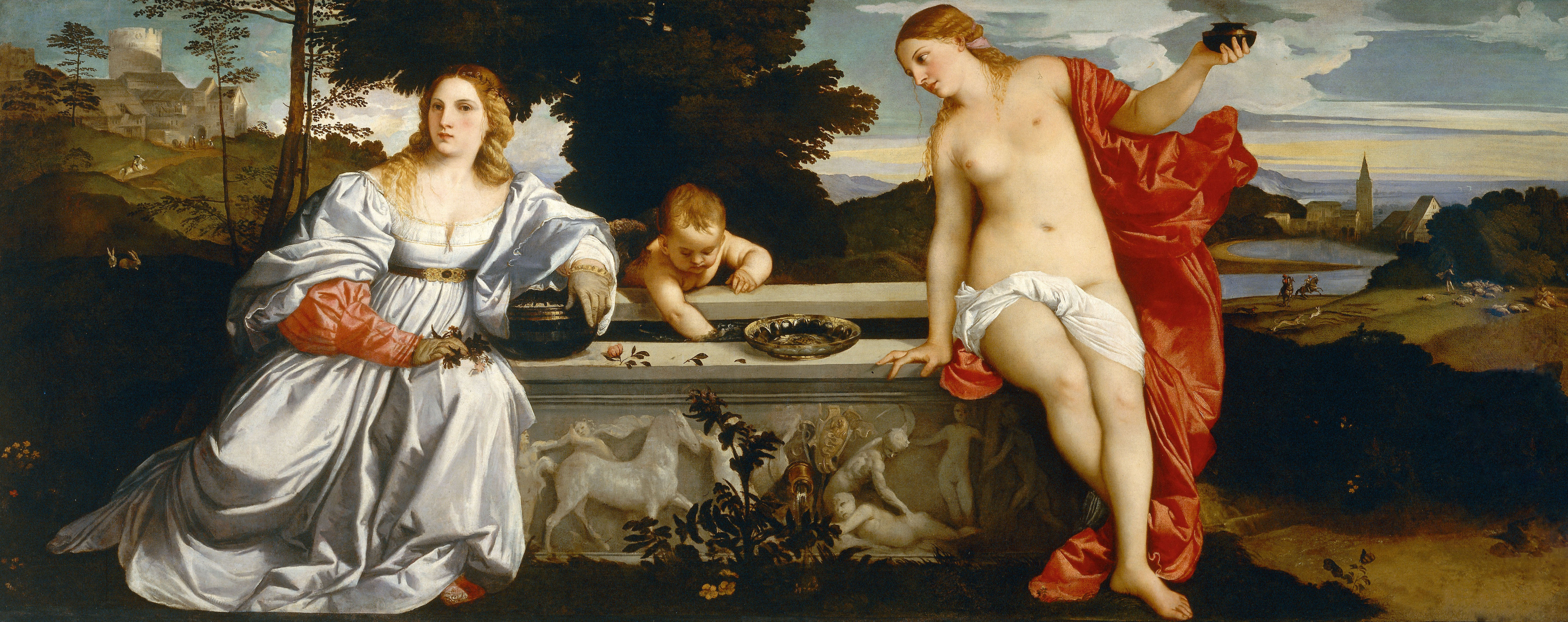
Titian's Sacred and Profane Love.

Titian's Sacred and Profane Love (1514; the sacred-profane title is from 1693) has several interpretations. The clothed woman has been said to be dressed as a bride and as a courtesan. The nude woman seems at first sight to be an allegory of profane love, but 20th-century assessments notice the incense on her hand and the church beyond her.

James Joyce widely utilized the Madonna–whore polarity in his novel A Portrait of the Artist as a Young Man. His protagonist, Stephen Daedalus, sees girls who he admires as ivory towers, and the repression of his sexual feelings for them eventually leads him to solicit a prostitute. This mortal sin drives Stephen's inner conflict and eventual transformation towards the end of the novel.

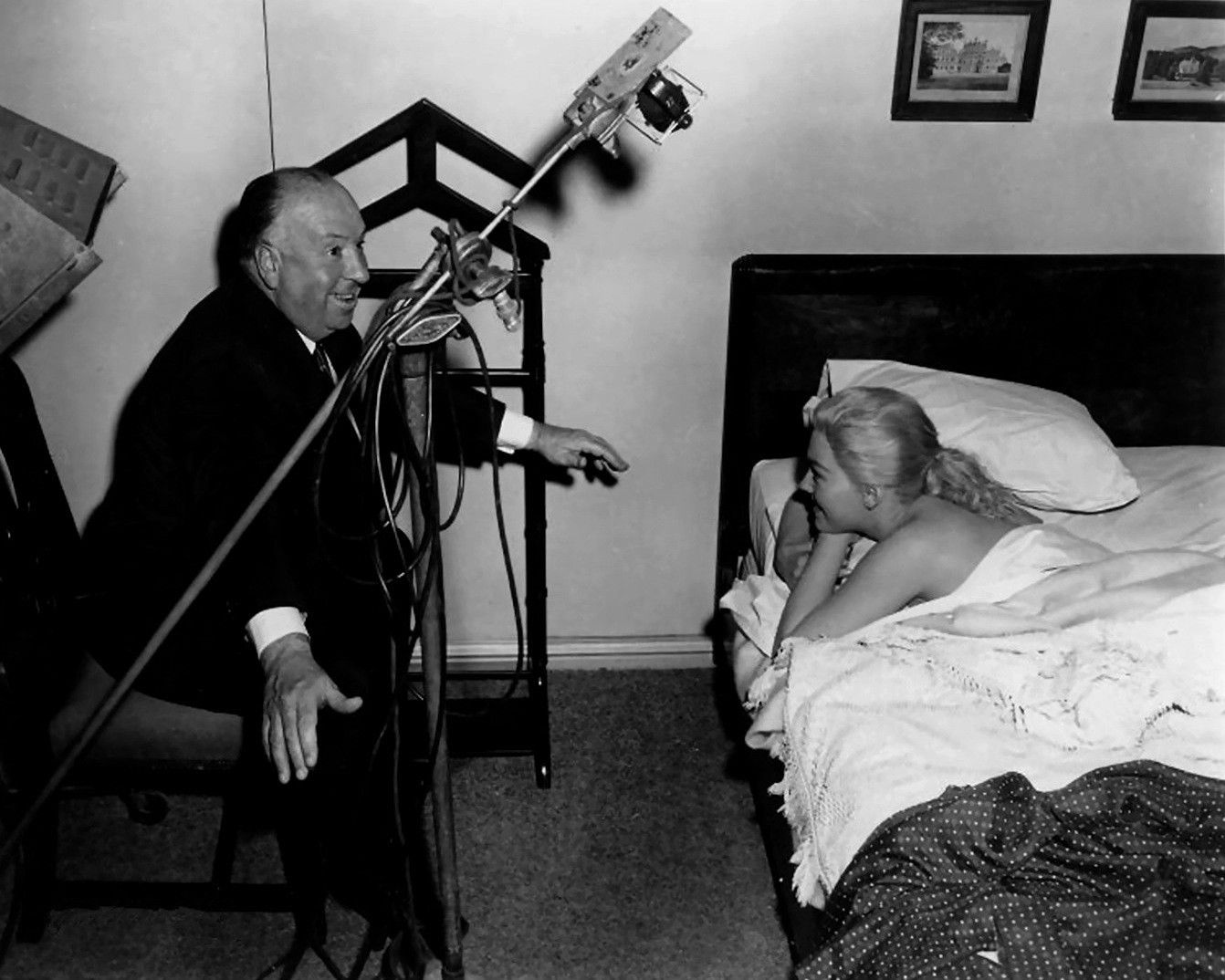
Hitchcock and Novak in Vertigo

In film, Alfred Hitchcock used the Madonna–whore complex as an important mode of representing women. In his film Vertigo, Kim Novak portrays two women that the hero cannot reconcile: a blonde, virtuous, sophisticated, repressed "Madonna" and a dark-haired, single, sensual "fallen woman".

The Martin Scorsese films Taxi Driver and Raging Bull featured sexually obsessed protagonists, both played by Robert De Niro, who exhibit the Madonna–whore complex.

The David Cronenberg film Spider focuses on the complex.

In Sylvia Plath's novel, The Bell Jar, the main character Esther Greenwood briefly speaks with a man named Eric, who emblematizes the Madonna-whore complex. After Eric relays a story of losing his virginity to a prostitute, describing it as "boring as going to the toilet," Greenwood's character recounts: "I said maybe if you loved a woman it wouldn’t seem so boring, but Eric said it would be spoiled by thinking this woman too was just an animal like the rest, so if he loved anybody he would never go to bed with her. He’d go to a whore if he had to and keep the woman he loved free of all that dirty business."

The Madonna-whore complex has also been used as advice for male heirs apparent for the choice of a spouse, due to the social standing and reputation of their wives as queens consort. Lord Mountbatten, for instance, advised his great-nephew Charles III, then Prince of Wales, to "sow his wild oats and have as many affairs as he can before settling down," but, for a wife, he "should choose a suitable, attractive, and sweet-charactered girl before she has met anyone else she might fall for … It is disturbing for women to have experiences if they have to remain on a pedestal after marriage."

== See also ==
- Ambivalence
- Coolidge effect
- Dichotomy
- Female Chauvinist Pigs
- Fraysexuality
- Friend zone
- Gender norms in abstinence-only sex education
- Love and hate (psychoanalysis)
- Love–hate relationship
- Machismo
- Marianismo
- Misogyny
- Ni Putes Ni Soumises
- Neo-Freudianism
- Sexism
- Splitting (psychology)
