= Suzanne Kessler =

American social psychologist (born 1946)

Suzanne Kessler (born October 13, 1946, in Pittsburgh, Pennsylvania) is an American social psychologist known for the application of ethnomethodology to gender. She and Wendy McKenna pioneered this application of ethnomethodology to the study of gender and sex with their groundbreaking work, Gender an Ethnomethodological Approach. Twenty years later, Kessler extended this work in a second book, Lessons from the Intersexed.

== Career ==
Kessler received her doctoral degree in social psychology at the City University of New York Graduate Center (1972) and a B.A. at Carnegie Mellon University (1968). She taught psychology for 30 years at Purchase College, State University of New York after which she became the dean of Natural and Social Sciences and then the dean of Liberal Arts and Sciences and Vice Provost. Kessler retired in 2018.

Kessler and McKenna's work was influenced by Harold Garfinkel in ethnomethodology (especially his analysis of Agnes in Studies in Ethnomethodology); Stanley Milgram, their social psychology professor; and the sociologist Peter McHugh, McKenna's professor. Kessler and McKenna were the first to argue that the distinction between "gender" and "sex" is a socially constructed one and the latter (defined by biological markers) should not be privileged. Their articulation of what later became known as the social construction of gender was part of the foundation for works of ultimately more well-known gender theorists, Judith Butler (1990), Anne Fausto-Sterling (1992), and Kate Bornstein (1994). Kessler and McKenna's concept of "gender attribution" predated William Zimmerman and Candace West's concept of doing gender and Butler's concept of gender performativity.

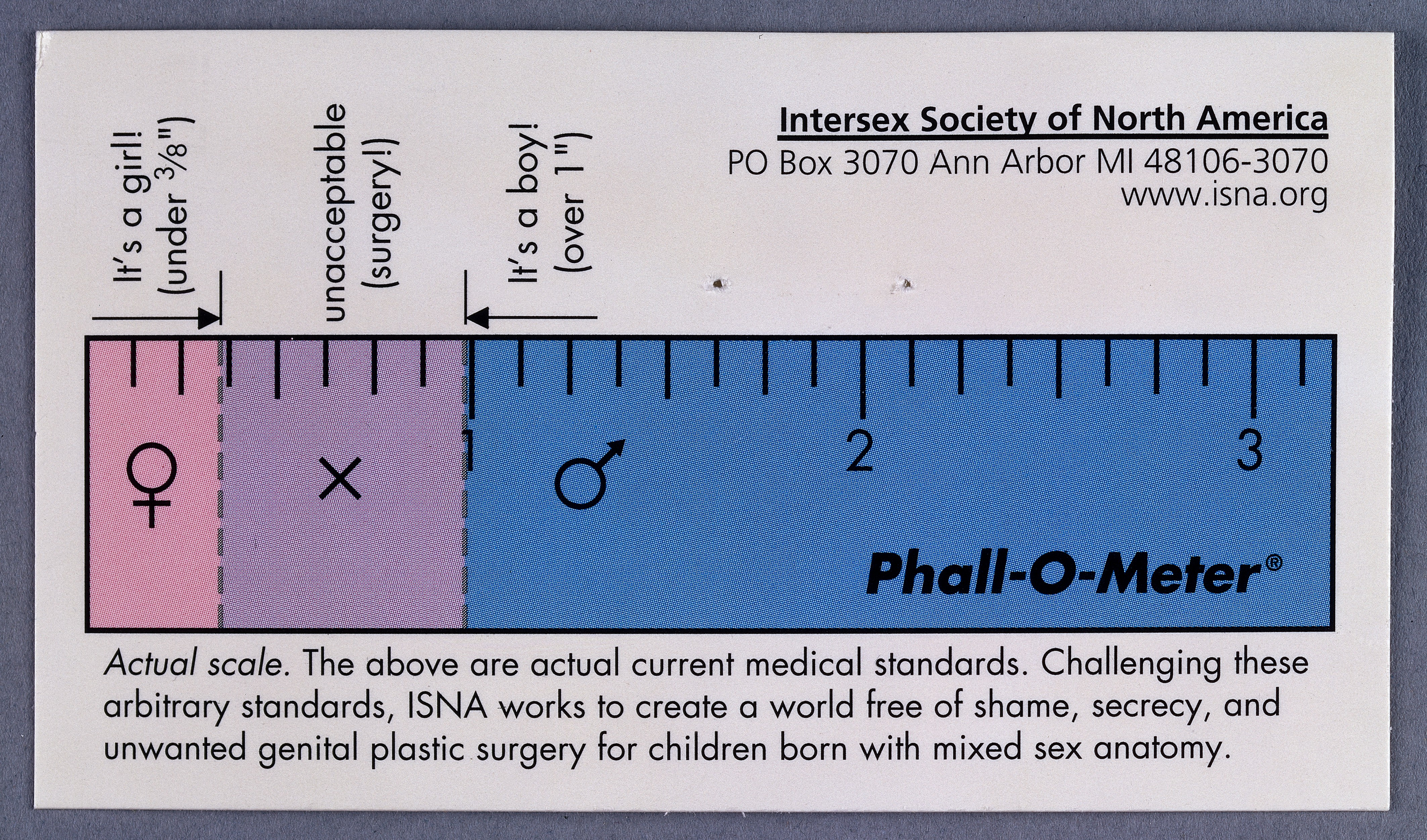
The Phall-O-Meter by the Intersex Society of North America satirizes clinical assessments of appropriate clitoris and penis length at birth. It is based on work by Kessler.

Kessler's work in her book Lessons from the Intersexed detailed the medical treatment of intersex children, and summarized the range of medically acceptable infant penis and clitoris sizes. Kessler states that normative tables for clitoral length appeared in the late 1980s, while normative tables for penis length appeared more than forty years before that. She combined those standard tables to demonstrate an "intermediate area of phallic length that neither females nor males are permitted to have", that is, a clitoris larger than 9 mm or a penis shorter than 25 mm. Her findings were then presented visually by the (now-defunct) advocacy organization Intersex Society of North America in the Phall-O-Meter. Copies of the Phall-O-Meter are now held by the Wellcome Library in London, and the Smithsonian Institution.

The importance of the work of Kessler and McKenna in feminist/gender theory was acknowledged by Mary Hawkesworth in a 1997 article published in Signs: Journal of Women in Culture and Society, "Confounding Gender". In it she investigates four efforts to theorize gender (Steven Smith's, Judith Butler's, R.W. Connell's, and Kessler and McKenna's). "The four works are the most ambitious efforts that I have found to theorize gender in ways that connect psyche, self, and social relations. They also represent some of the major methodological approaches (phenomenology, postmodern deconstruction, dialectical materialism, ethnomethodology) currently vying for the allegiance of feminist scholars." Three years later, most of a 2000 issue of Feminism & Psychology was devoted to a reappraisal of their book with commentary by seven theorists (Mary Crawford, Carla Golden, Leonore Tiefer, Holly (later Aaron) Devor, Milton Diamond, Eva Lundgren, and Dallas Denny). The introductory essay states that when Kessler and McKenna wrote their book, "the social construction of gender", let alone sex, was still a relatively novel idea. "They not only made the claim that sex is a belief system rather than a fact, but went on to analyze the interpretive practices that enable each of us to create the "fact" of two and only two sexes . The continuing importance of Kessler and McKenna's work is twofold: First, it provides compelling, lived examples of the social construction of gender in interaction . The second reason is: the current multiplicity of theoretical positions on gender mutability, coupled with the increased visibility of transgendered and intersex people."

Suzanne Kessler's transgender papers can be found at the Transgender Archives at the University of Victoria, and her intersex papers at the Labadie Collection at the University of Michigan.

== Books ==
- Kessler, S. and McKenna, W. Gender: An Ethnomethodological Approach: NY: Wiley Interscience (1978); reprinted University of Chicago Press (1985).
- Kessler, Suzanne J. (1998). Lessons from the intersexed. New Brunswick, N.J: Rutgers University Press. ISBN 978-0-8135-2529-7.

== Articles and chapters ==
- Michals, I. & Kessler, S. Prison Teachers and Their Students: A Circle of Satisfaction and Gain. The Journal of Correctional Education, 66, (2015) 47- 62.
- Kessler, S. Psychology Students Learn How to use Evidence to Inform Practice, to Think Critically, and Write well. In K. Vaidya (ed.) Psychology for the Curious: Why Study Psychology. Curious Academic Publishing, (2015).
- Halperin, R., Kessler, S., & Braunschweiger, D. Rehabilitation Through the Arts: Impact on participants’ engagement in educational programs. The Journal of Correctional Education, 63, 1, (2012) 6 – 23.
- Kessler, S. A Scientist Advocates for Better Science. Sex Roles, 65, 1-2, (2011): 140-142.
- Reis, Elizabeth; Kessler, Suzanne (September 2010). "Why History Matters: Fetal Dex and Intersex". American Journal of Bioethics. 10 (9): 58–59. doi:10.1080/15265161.2010.499586. ISSN 1526-5161. PMID 20818565. S2CID 32104121.
- Meyer-Bahlburg, H. F. L., Dolezal, C., Johnson, L.L., Kessler, S. J., Schober, J. M., & Zucker, K.J. Development and Validation of the Pregnancy and Infant Orientation Questionnaire. Journal of Sex Research. 47, 6, (2009): 598-610.
- Deogracias, J.J., Johnson, L.L., Meyer-Bahlburg, H. F. L., Kessler, S. J., Schober, J. M., & Zucker, K. J. The Gender Identity/Gender Dysphoria Questionnaire for Adolescents and Adults. The Journal of Sex Research, 44, 4, (2007): 370-379.
- Meyer-Bahlburg, H. F. L., Dolezal, C., Zucker, K. J., Kessler, S. J., Schober, J. M., & New, M. I. The Recalled Childhood Gender Questionnaire-Revised: A Psychometric Analysis in a Sample of Women with Congenital Adrenal Hyperplasia. The Journal of Sex Research, 43, 4, (November 2006): 364–367.
- McKenna W. and Kessler, S. Transgendering. In M. Evans, K. Davis, & J. Lorber (eds.) Handbook of Gender and Women's Studies.London: Sage (2006): 342- 354. Reprinted in M. S. Kimmel and A. Aronson (eds.) The Gendered Society Reader. NY. : Oxford University Press, 2008.
- Kessler, S.J. and McKenna, W. The Primacy of Gender Attribution In Devine and -Devine (eds.) Sex and Gender: A Spectrum of Views. Adsworth/Thompson, (2003):43 - 53.
- Kessler, S. Questioning Assumptions about Gender Assignment in Cases of Intersexuality. Dialogues in Pediatric Urology, 25, 6, (June 2002): 3-4.
- McKenna, W. and Kessler, S.J. Who put the ‘Trans’ in Transgender? International Journal of Transgenderism, 4, 3, (September 2000). Reprinted in S. LaFont (ed) Constructing Sexualities: in Sexuality, Gender, and Culture. N.J.: Prentice Hall, 2002.
- McKenna, W. and Kessler, S.J. Gender Retrospective, Feminism and Psychology, 10, 1, (2000): 7-72.
- Kessler, Suzanne (Fall 1997). "Meanings of Gender Variability Constructs of Sex and Gender". Chrysalis: The Journal of Transgressive Gender Identities. 2 (4).
- McKenna, W. and Kessler, Who Needs Gender Theory? Signs: Journal of Women in Culture and Society, Spring (1997): 687-691. Also in and A.. (eds.) Provoking Feminisms. Chicago: University of Chicago Press, (2000): 179-183.
- Kessler, S. J. Creating Good-Looking Genitals in the Service of Gender. In M. Duberman (ed.) A Queer World: The Center for Lesbian and Gay Studies Reader, vol 1. New York: New York University Press, (1997): 153-173.
- Kessler, Suzanne (1990). "The Medical Construction of Gender: Case Management of Intersexed Infants". Signs. 16 (1): 3–26. doi:10.1086/494643. JSTOR 3174605. S2CID 33122825.
  - Reprinted in:
    - Taylor, Whittier, and Rupp (eds.), Feminist Frontiers VII, McGraw-Hill, 2006.
    - Hussey (ed.), Masculinities: Interdisciplinary Readings, Prentice Hall, 2003, pp. 25–41.
    - Wyer, Barbercheck, Giesman, and Ozturk (eds.), Women, Science, and Technology, Routledge, 2001, pp. 161–174.
    - Sex/Machine: In Culture, Gender, and Technology. Indiana University Press, 1998.
    - Nelson and Robinson (eds.), Gender in the 1990s: Images, Realities, and Issues, 1996.
    - Frankin (ed.), The Sociology of Gender, Edward Elgar Publishing, 1996.
    - Laslett, Kohlstedt, and Longino (eds.), Gender and Scientific Authority, 1996, pp. 340–363.
    - Herrmann (ed.), Theorizing Feminism. Westview Press, 1994, pp. 218–256.
    - Gender in Science Workbook. Kendall/Hunt (publication date unspecified).
- Kessler, S., etal. Voices. In ACT UP/NY Women and AIDS Book Group (eds.) Women, AIDS, and Activism. Boston : South End Press, (1990): 143-155.
- Kessler, S. J. Psychology. In A. Waldhorn, O.S. Webber & A. Zeiger (eds.). Good Reading: A guide for serious readers. New York : R. R. Bowker, (1990): 277-283. (earlier edition 1985)
- McKenna, W. & Kessler, S. Asking taboo questions and doing taboo deeds. In & (eds.) The Social Construction of the Person. N.Y. Springer‑Verlag, (1986): 241‑257.
- Kessler, S. J. etal. (eds.). Heresies: Sex Issue. (1981): 3(4), issue 12.
- Leslie, S., R., Saron, C., Kessler, S., &, W. Event related potentials in response to ambiguous male and female faces: Biocognitive substrates of gender recognition. Psychophysiology (abstract), (1980).
- Kessler, S. J., McKenna, W. & Graham, R. The effect of generic pronouns on imaging and recall. Behaviorists for Social Action Journal, (1979): 2, l‑3.
- Albert, S. & Kessler, Empirical characteristics of ending social encounters. Journal of Experimental Social Psychology, (1978): 14, 54l‑553.
- McKenna, W. & Kessler, Experimental design as a source of bias in social psychology. Sex Roles, (1977): 3, 117‑128.
- Albert, S. & Kessler, Six processes of ending: A conceptual archeology of temporal place. Journal for the Theory of Social Behaviour, (1976): 6, 147‑171.
- Kessler, S. J., McKenna, W., Stang, D., Sweet, S. & Russell, V. The job market in psychology: A study of despair. Personality and Social Psychology Bulletin, (1976): 2(1), 22‑26.
- Milgram, S., Greenwald, J., Kessler, S., McKenna, W. & Waters, J. A Psychological Map of New York City. American Scientist. (1972): 60, 194‑200.
- Milgram, S. (1977), The Individual in a social world: Essays and experiments. 3rd expanded edition published 2010 by Pinter and Martin.

== Community service ==
Since 2002, Kessler has been on the board of Rehabilitation Through the Arts. She was also on the Board of The Children's Center at Purchase College, SUNY from 1986 to 2018.
