= Behavioral script =

Expected behaviors

In the behaviorism approach to psychology, behavioral scripts are a sequence of expected behaviors for a given situation. Scripts include default standards for the actors, props, setting, and sequence of events that are expected to occur in a particular situation. The classic script example involves an individual dining at a restaurant. This script has several components: props, including tables, menus, food, and money; as well as roles, including customers, servers, chefs, and a cashier. The sequence of expected events for this script begins with a hungry customer entering the restaurant, ordering, eating, paying and then ends with the customer exiting. People continually follow scripts which are acquired through habit, practice and simple routine. Following a script can be useful because it can help to save the time and mental effort of deciding on appropriate behavior each time a situation is encountered.

== Psychology ==
Behavioral scripts allow people to make realistic assumptions about situations, places, and people. These assumptions stem from what are known as schemas. Schemas make the environment more easily understandable; therefore, people are able to familiarize themselves with what is around them. When people become comfortable with what they find familiar, they are more likely to remember events, people or places that deviate from their initial thought or script.

Semantic memory—the knowledge that people gain from experiencing events in the everyday world—builds schemas and scripts. This information is then organized into a concept that people understand in their own ways. Scripts are made through the knowledge that one gains through these everyday experiences and habituation.

Some people may have a tendency to habituate behavioral scripts in a manner that can act to limit consciousness in a subliminal way. This can negatively influence the subconscious mind and, subsequently, can negatively affect perceptions, judgments, values, beliefs, cognition and behavior. For example, over-reliance upon behavioral scripts combined with social norms that encourage an individual to use these behavioral scripts may influence one to stereotype and develop a prejudiced attitude toward others based on socioeconomic status, ethnicity, race, etc.

Much of the development of scripts first addresses language and how it influences what one knows and understands. With language, many psychologists have used the specific study of language to develop theories about concepts and scripts. In particular, researchers recognize semantic memory development is mostly possible through verbal-linguistic stimuli. People constantly use language and memory to interpret and relate to experiences or people. Here, language has influence on the scripts people use because of its relationship to semantic memory.

Some applied behavior analysts use scripts to train new skills; script use may be an effective way to build new language, social, and activity routines for adults and children with developmental disabilities. With language scripts fading, efforts are made in an attempt to help the scripts recombine in order to approximate more natural language.

Many empirical research studies have been conducted in order to test the validity of the script theory. One such study, conducted by Bower, Black, and Turner in 1979, asked participants to read 18 different scenarios, all of which represented a doctor's office script. The participants were later asked to complete either a recall task or a recognition task. In the recall task, the participants were asked to remember as much as they could about each scenario. Here, the participants tended to recall certain parts of the stories that were not actually present, but that were parts of the scripts that the stories represented. In the recognition task, participants were asked to rate various sentences on a seven-point scale regarding their personal confidence that they had seen each sentence in the scenario. Some sentences shown to participants were from the stories and some were not. Of the sentences that were not from the stories, some were relevant to the doctor's office script and others were not relevant to the script at all. Here, participants tended to recognize certain non-story sentences as having come from the story if the non-story sentence was relevant to the script. Ultimately, Bower, Black, and Turner's study suggested that scripts serve as a guide for a person's recall and recognition for certain things that they already know.

There are instances where damage to a person's script affects to their ability to understand concepts. For instance, Sirigu, Zalla, Pillon, Grafman, Agid, and Dubois (1995) conducted a study on brain-damaged patients and their ability to access scripts that relate to a certain situation. Within their study, they asked patients with brain-damage (particularly to the prefrontal cortex) to make as many scripts for different situations as they could and put them in their commonly known sequence. These researchers found that those with prefrontal brain damage could make just as many scripts for different situations as those without prefrontal brain damage. However, the researchers also found that patients with prefrontal brain damage had a difficult time putting in order or sequencing the events that happen within a script. They concluded that the prefrontal brain-damaged patients had difficulty in finding the goal of each script, where each script has a specific thing that a person looks for to achieve. For example, within the script of going to a restaurant, the goal of the dinner would be to eat. Prefrontal brain-damaged patients, however, are likely to see the goal of the script as paying for the meal or ordering food.

== See also ==
- Frame (artificial intelligence)
- Gender script
- Knowledge representation and reasoning
- Procedural knowledge
- Sexual script theory
- Social schemas
