= Social construction of gender =

Theory in feminism and sociology

The social construction of gender is a theory in the humanities and social sciences about the manifestation of cultural origins, mechanisms, and corollaries of gender perception and expression in the context of interpersonal and group social interaction. Specifically, the social constructionist theory of gender stipulates that gender roles are an achieved "status" in a social environment, which implicitly and explicitly categorize people and therefore motivate social behaviors.

Social constructionism is a theory of knowledge that explores the interplay between reality and human perception, asserting that reality is shaped by social interactions and perceptions. This theory contrasts with objectivist epistemologies, particularly in rejecting the notion that empirical facts alone define reality. Social constructionism emphasizes the role of social perceptions in creating reality, often relating to power structures and hierarchies.

Gender, a key concept in social constructionism, distinguishes between biological sex and socialized gender roles. Feminist theory views gender as an achieved status, shaped by social interactions and normative beliefs. The World Health Organization highlights that gender intersects with social and economic inequalities, a concept known as intersectionality. Gender roles are socially constructed and vary across cultures and contexts, with empirical studies indicating more similarities than differences between genders. Judith Butler's distinction between gender performativity and gender roles underscores the performative aspect of gender, influenced by societal norms and individual expression.

Gender identity refers to an individual's internal sense of their own gender, influenced by social contexts and personal experiences. This identity intersects with other social identities, such as race and class, affecting how individuals navigate societal expectations. The accountability for gender performance is omnirelevant, meaning it is constantly judged in social interactions. Some studies show that gender roles and expectations are learned from early childhood and reinforced throughout life, impacting areas like the workplace, where gender dynamics and discrimination are evident.

In education and media, gender construction plays a significant role in shaping individuals' identities and societal expectations. Teachers and media representations influence how gender roles are perceived and enacted, often perpetuating stereotypes. The concept of gender performativity suggests that gender is an ongoing performance shaped by societal norms, rather than a fixed trait. This performative view of gender challenges traditional binary understandings and opens up discussions on the fluidity of gender and the impact of socialization on gender identity.

== Basic concepts ==
=== Social constructionism ===
Social constructionism is a theory of knowledge that posits that the way we understand the world does not simply reflect an objective reality. It asserts that the meanings, categories, and knowledge we use are constructed through language and social interactions, and vary according to time and place.

The social constructionist approach emerged as a critique of sociological positivism; that is, social constructionism rejects the premise that knowledge can be objective and value-free, while positivism is defined by it. Much literature on the subject of social constructionism focuses on the relationship between social constructs and power relations.

According to Fitzsimmons & Lennon, the constructionist accounts of gender creation can be divided into two main streams:

1. Materialist theories, which underline the structural aspects of the social environment that are responsible for perpetuating certain gender roles;
2. Discursive theories, which stress the creation, through language and culture, of meanings that are associated with gender.

They also argue that both the materialist and discursive theories of social construction of gender can be either essentialist or non-essentialist. This means that some of these theories assume a clear biological division between women and men when considering the social creation of masculinity and femininity, while other contest the assumption of the biological division between the sexes as independent of social construction.

Theories that imply that gendered behavior is totally or mostly due to social conventions and culture represent an extreme nurture position in the nature versus nurture debate.

=== Gender ===
Gender is used as a means of describing the distinction between the biological sex and socialized aspects of femininity and masculinity. According to West and Zimmerman, gender is not a personal trait; it is "an emergent feature of social situations: both as an outcome of and a rationale for various social arrangements, and as a means of legitimating one of the most fundamental divisions of society. According to Kessler and McKenna, a world of two "sexes" is a result of the socially shared, taken-for-granted methods that members use to construct reality.

As a social construct, gender is considered an achieved status by feminist theory, typically (though not exclusively) one which is achieved very early in childhood. The view as achieved is supported by the contemporary constructionist perspective, as proposed by Fenstermaker and West, asserts regarding gender as an activity ("doing") of utilizing normative prescriptions and beliefs about sex categories based on situational variables. These "gender activities" constitute sets of behavior, such as masculine and feminine, which are associated with their sexual counterpart and thus define concepts such as "man" and "woman" respectively. It is noted, however, that the perception as masculine or feminine is not limited or guaranteed to match the expression's typical or intended nature.

The World Health Organization stated in 2023 that

Gender is hierarchical and produces inequalities that intersect with other social and economic inequalities. Gender-based discrimination intersects with other factors of discrimination, such as ethnicity, socioeconomic status, disability, age, geographic location, gender identity and sexual orientation, among others. This is referred to as intersectionality.

In the context of feminist theory, the word status deviates from its colloquial usage meaning rank or prestige but instead refers to a series of strata or categories by which societies are divided, in some ways synonymous with "labels" or "roles". The semantic distinctions of "labels" and "roles" are homogenized into the term "status" and then re-differentiated by the division into "ascribed status" and "achieved status" respectively.

==== Gender roles ====
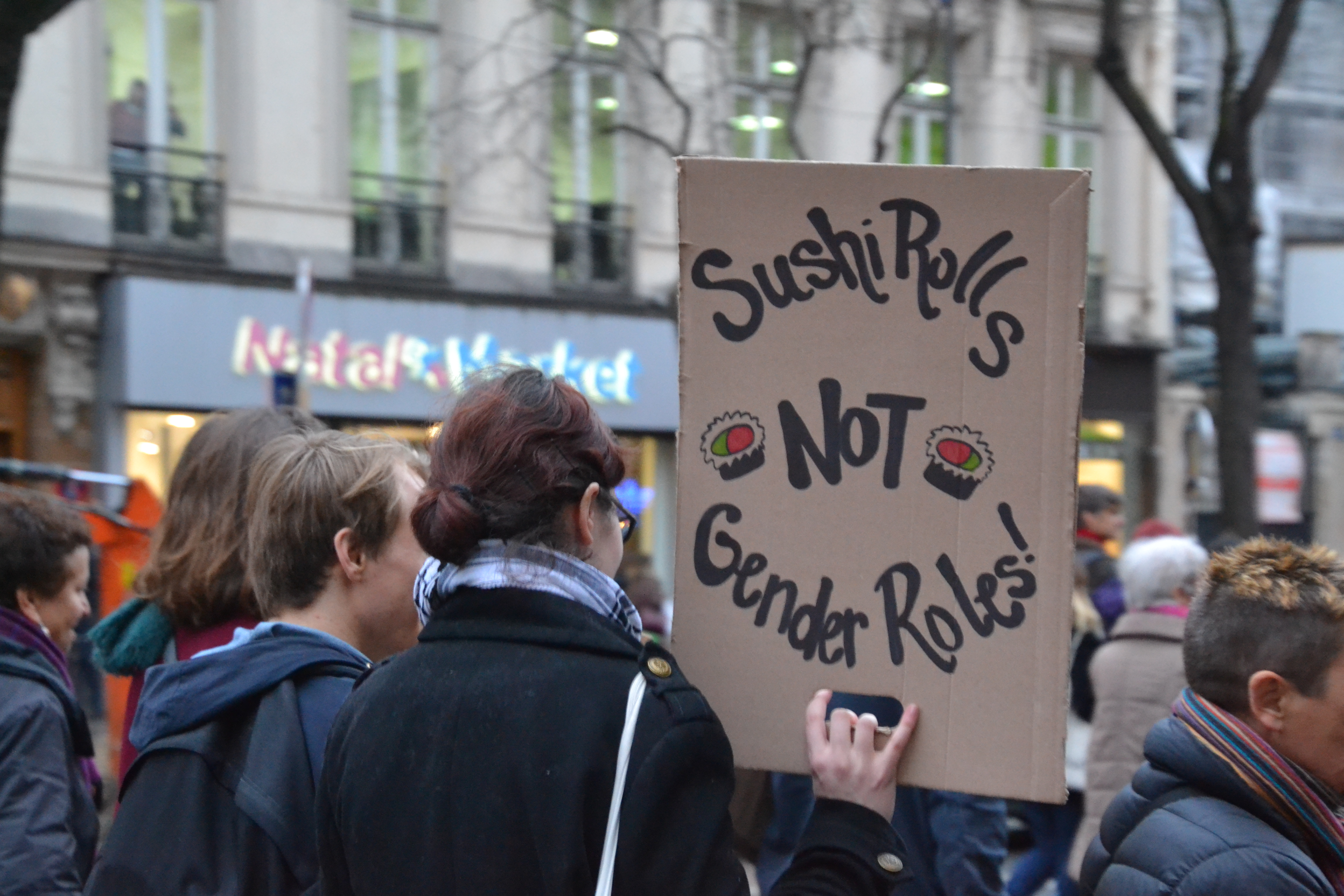
A photo taken during a rally/march of a person holding a sign stating "Sushi Rolls Not Gender Roles"

Gender roles are a continuation of the gender status, consisting of other achieved statuses that are associated with a particular gender status. In less theoretical terms, gender roles are functional position in a social dynamic for which fulfillment is a part of "doing gender". The concept was first introduced in the 1950s by psychologist and sexologist John Money.

Empirical investigations suggest that gender roles are "social constructs that vary significantly across time, context, and culture". Ronald F. Levant and Kathleen Alto write:

A recent synthesis of meta-analytic studies of gender differences provides strong evidence for a social construct understanding of gender. Ethan Zell and colleagues examined more than 20,000 findings from 12 million participants comparing men and women on topics ranging from risk-taking to body image. The authors found that the majority of effects were very small to small, indicating far more similarities than differences between genders.

American philosopher Judith Butler makes a distinction between gender performativity and gender roles, which delineates between the social behaviors of the individual seeking to express the behavior which articulate their own perception of their gender; and behavior which creates the perception of compliance with societal gender expressions in aggregate. This is not to imply that participation in gender performativity cannot correspond to pressure to fulfill a gender role, nor that fulfillment of a gender role cannot satisfy the desire for gender performativity. The distinction refers primarily to context and motivation, rather than particular behaviors and consequences- which are often closely linked. Research by Liva and Arqueros describes gendered behaviors being taught. In Argentina, missionaries intending to educate the Qom people reinforced a conversion to gender norms and European modernity on the indigenous community.

In some subdomains of feminism, such as intersectional feminism, gender is a major though not solitary axis along which factors of oppression are considered, as expressed by Berkowitz, who wrote "The gender order is hierarchical in that, overall, men dominate women in terms of power and privilege; yet multiple and conflicting sources of power and oppression are intertwined, and not all men dominate all women. Intersectionality theorizes how gender intersects with race, ethnicity, social class, sexuality, and nation in variegated and situationally contingent ways".

Berkowitz also asserts that gender at large, especially gender roles, contribute greatly as a prolific and potent avenue by which manipulations of social perceptions and expression manifest reality. Specifically, a reality in which women are typically oppressed by men within a social structure that establishes roles for women, which are of explicitly lesser capacity for accruing and exercising arbitrary power. The system which manifest and exercises this power, is typically referred to as "patriarchy". To clarify, the term arbitrary here is used to denote the source of power as being derived from status as feminist theory describes it. The particular model of patriarchy prescribed, does not make any distinction of stratification or power originating from competence or prestige.

===== Socialization =====
In sociology, socialization is the process of internalizing the norms of society. Socialization encompasses both learning and teaching and is thus "the means by which social and cultural continuity are attained". Gender socialization is the process through which individuals develop a gender identity and learn the behaviors associated with their society’s categories of male and female. It begins in early childhood and is shaped by a complex interaction of influences.

Anthropologist Catherine L. Besteman observes the differences in gender roles in the context of parenting by Somali Bantu refugees in Lewiston, Maine; The separate roles communicate the agency of individuals based on their gender – agency in which males tend to be favored in terms of social power. Girls seemed to be "under increasing scrutiny to behave respectably as parents attempted to protect them from America's public sexual culture in the only way they know: early arranged marriage and lots of responsibilities for domestic tasks". Boys, however, were given less responsibilities and more freedom. The distinction between the responsibilities of boys and girls define the refugees' children's understanding of what it means to belong to a particular gender in America with association to "parental authority". Besteman observed the contrast to be a result of a lack of traditional male chores in America compared to Somalia, such as farm work, while the traditional female chores were able to be maintained.

Research on gender socialization draws from sociology, psychology, and psychoanalysis, and has evolved through several major theoretical approaches.

==== Gender identity ====
Gender identity is a related concept, but instead of referring to the external social understanding developed between persons, gender identity refers to the internal sense of ones own gender on an individual scale. It was coined by psychiatry professor Robert Stoller in 1964.

According to Alsop, Fitzsimmons & Lennon, "Gender is part of an identity woven from a complex and specific social whole, and requiring very specific and local readings". Thus, gender identity can be defined as part of socially situated understanding of gender. LaFrance, Paluck and Brescoll note that as a term, "gender identity" allows individuals to express their attitude towards and stance in relation to their current status as either women or men. Turning the scope of gender from a social consensus to objectivity to one's self-identification with a certain gender expression leaves much more space for describing variation among individuals.

===== Intersections of gender identity with other identities =====
While men and women are held accountable for normative conceptions of gender, this accountability can differ in content based on ethnicity, race, age, class, etc. Hurtado argues that white women and women of color experience gender differently because of their relationship to males of different races and that both groups of women have traditionally been used to substantiate male power in different ways. Fenstermaker says that some women of color are subordinated through rejection, or denial of the "patriarchal invitation to privilege". For instance, some white men may see women of color as workers and objects of sexual aggression; this would allow the men to display power and sexual aggression without the emotional attachment that they have to white women. White women are accountable for their gendered display as traditionally subservient to white men while women of color may be held accountable for their gendered performance as sexual objects and as recalcitrant and bawdy women in relations with white men. West and Fenstermaker conclude that doing gender involves different versions of accountability, depending on women's "relational position" to white men.

Moroccan women in Belgium with high-skill jobs report struggling to find a work–life balance; they leave ethnicity out of the discussed influences on professional identity, but do discuss gender. Portrayals of gender can be advantageous or disadvantageous for Moroccan women in the Belgian workplace. Disadvantages include the view of women in their twenties as busy with homemaking and child-rearing, and the Islamic tradition of wearing a headscarf leading to discrimination. Advantages include second generation immigrant women receiving less discrimination than men, and being highly educated further reduces chances of discrimination.

In the U.S., changes in gender ideology relate to changes in an individual's life, such as becoming a parent, getting a job, and other milestones. Racial differences and gender are determiners of treatment in the workplace; African American mothers suffer a wage penalty if they are married with big families, while white women are penalized upon becoming a mother. African American husbands are not seen as serious economic providers, and do not receive a wage premium for parenthood, while white fathers do. Current, full-time working women have a more egalitarian gender ideology than non-working or part-time women. Men relate work to providing roles and only shift to a more egalitarian gender ideology when opportunities are blocked and they learn to redefine success; blocked opportunities are more prevalent for black men.

==== Sexuality/sexual orientation ====
In recent years, elementary schools in the U.S. have started carrying chapter books that include either non-traditional families with same-sex parents, homosexual role models, or (in fewer cases) an adolescent who is discovering and accepting their own sexuality/sexual orientation. Hermann-Wilmarth and Ryan acknowledge this rise in representation, while critiquing the way that the limited selection of books present these characters with an eye towards popularized characterizations of homosexuality. The authors characterize this style of representation as "homonormative", and in the only example of a book where the protagonist questions their gender identity, it is left ambiguous as to whether or not they are a trans man or that they were simply pretending.

Diamond and Butterworth argue that gender identity and sexual identity are fluid and do not always fall into two essentialist categories (man or woman and gay or straight); they came to this conclusion via interviewing women that fall into a sexual minority group over the course of ten years. One woman had a relatively normal early childhood but around adolescence questioned her sexuality and remained stable in her gender and sexual identity until she started working with men and assumed a masculine "stance" and started to question her gender identity. When 'she' became a 'he' he began to find men attractive and gradually identified as a homosexual man.

The perception of sexuality by others is an extension of others' perceptions of one's gender. Heterosexuality is assumed for those individuals who appear to act appropriately masculine or appropriately feminine. If one wants to be perceived as a lesbian, one must first be perceived as a woman; if one wants to be seen as a gay man, one has to be seen as a man.

== Social learning theory ==
Gender features strongly in most societies and is a significant aspect of self-definition for most people. One way to analyze the social influences that affect the development of gender is through social learning theory, a psychological theory of social behavior. When applied to the study of gender, it describes how children develop gendered behaviors by interacting with and observing the people around them.

For the individual, gender construction starts with assignments to a sex category on the basis of biological genitalia at birth. Following this sexual assignment, parents begin to influence gender identity by dressing children in ways that clearly display this biological category. Therefore, biological sex becomes associated with a gender through naming, dress, and the use of other gender markers. Gender development continues to be affected by the outlooks of others, education institutions, parenting, media, etc. These variations of social interactions force individuals to "learn what is expected, see what is expected, act and react in expected ways, and thus simultaneously construct and maintain the gender order".

An extension of social learning theory is social cognitive theory. According to Kay Bussey, social cognitive theory describes "how gender conceptions are developed and transformed across the life span". The social cognitive theory views gender roles as socially constructed ideas that are obtained over one's entire lifetime. These gender roles are instilled in us from "the moment we are born" and "repeatedly reinforced through socialization".

=== Gender-based harassment ===
It is very common for gender-based harassment to occur throughout the academic years of a person's life. This serves as a form of gender boundary policing. Women are expected to conform to stereotypical gendered appearances, as are men. Students regularly take part in policing gender boundaries through bullying. Male students frequently harass male and female students, while female students generally only harass other female students. The practice of male students bullying other male students is explicitly linked to machismo, which is the notion that boys are expected to subscribe to in order to be constructed and related to as 'normal' boys. Many girls report that boys tease and ridicule them on the basis of their appearance, which is linked to boys asserting masculine power through sexist practices of denigrating girls. This also serves to perpetuate the idea that appearance is a female's most important asset. In their study, "Correlates and Consequences of Peer Victimization: Gender Differences in Direct and Indirect Forms of Bullying", Lopez, Esbensen & Brick state that "boys were more likely to experience direct or physical forms of bullying and girls were more likely to report being teased or joked about." This can be interpreted as females typically harassing other females in more of a mental, emotional, and psychological torment while males take more of a physical and aggressive approach. Unique appearances and attempts to stand out among girls are regarded very negatively. This type of female on female bullying sets the standard for norms on appearance and the importance of conforming to the societal expectations of that appearance for females. Overall, gender-based harassment serves to define and enforce gender boundaries of students by students.

=== Adolescent view of adulthood ===
Gender is a cultural construction which creates an environment where an adolescent's performance in high school is related to their life goals and expectations. Because some young women believe that they want to be mothers and wives, the choice of professions and future goals can be inherently flawed by the gender constraints. Because a girl may want to be a mother later, her academics in high school can create clear gender differences because "higher occupational expectations, educational expectations, and academic grades were more strongly associated with the expected age of parenthood for girls than for boys". With "young women recognizing potential conflicts between the demands of work and family", they will not try as hard in high school allowing males to achieve higher academic achievement then girls. Crocket and Beal in their article "The Life Course in the Making: Gender and the Development of Adolescents", "gender differences in the anticipated timing of future role transitions, the impact of expectations and values on these expected timings, and the extent to which expectations foreshadow actual behavior". The actions of a youth in high school greatly impact the choices the individual will have over a lifetime. Women especially are constrained in the way they view their adulthood even at a young age because of motherhood.

Males can also be subject to gender construction due to social expectations of masculinity. According to Jack Halberstam (under the name Judith), people correlate masculinity with "maleness and to power to domination", something that he believes is a result of patriarchy. In a 2015 study published in the American Journal of Public Health, researchers stated that gender construct can differ depending on the man's race or ethnicity and stated that for white men there was an emphasis on "education, employment, and socioeconomic status" whereas the expectations for black men focused on "sexual prowess, physical dominance, and gamesmanship". These expectations can make it harder for males to display emotions without receiving criticism and being seen as less of a man.

Adolescents view on adulthood is also determined by their employment in high school. Many boys work during high school and "unlike young women, young men who had not worked during high school did not quite match their peers". Because many other boys are working, those who do not work may not be as successful after graduation. In the book Working and Growing Up in America, Jeylan T. Mortimer explains "youth who work during high school, and those who devote more hours to work, are more vocationally successful after leaving high school". This creates a distinct gender difference in which men are more likely to be employed after high school than women if they have worked during high school. This means women may be at an academic advantage if they do not work in high school and focus on school work.

=== Body image ===
There are many different factors that affect body image, "including sex, media, parental relationship, and puberty as well as weight and popularity". The intersectionality of these factors causes individualistic experiences for adolescents during this period within their lives. As their body changes, so does the environment in which they live in. Body image is closely linked to psychological well-being during adolescence and can cause harmful effects when a child has body dissatisfaction. In the article "Body Image and Psychological Well-Being in Adolescents: The Relationship between Gender and School Type", Helen Winfield explains that an adolescent's high school experience is closely linked to their perceived body image. She analyzed over 336 teenagers and found "ratings of physical attractiveness and body image remain relatively stable across the early teenage years, but become increasingly negative around age 15–18 years because of pubertal changes". This shift during the high school years may cause serious psychological problems for adolescents. These psychological problems can manifest into eating disorders causing serious lifelong problems. Due to these findings, it is shown that these body image issues are especially prevalent in girls but as boys enter puberty, expectations of height and muscle mass change as well. Geoffrey H. Cohane, Harrison G. Pope Jr. in their article, "Body image in boys: A review of the literature", claim that "girls typically wanted to be thinner, boys frequently wanted to be bigger". This statistic displays that gender difference in body image cause different beauty ideals. Gender can have an impact of affecting an adolescent's body image and potentially their high school experience.

=== Education ===
Due to the amount of time that children spend in school, "teachers are influential role models for many aspects of children's educational experiences, including gender socialization". Teachers who endorse the culturally dominant gender-role stereotype regarding the distribution of talent between males and females distort their perception of their students' mathematical abilities and effort resources in mathematics, in a manner that is consistent with their gender-role stereotype and to a greater extent than teachers who do not endorse the stereotype.

According to the 1994 report Intelligence: Knowns and Unknowns by the American Psychological Association, "[m]ost standard tests of intelligence have been constructed so that there are no overall score differences between females and males." Differences have been found, however, in specific areas such as mathematics and verbal measures. Even within mathematics, it is noted that significant differences in performance as a result of gender do not occur until late in high school, a result of biological differences, the exhibition of stereotypes by teachers, and the difference in chosen coursework between individual students. While, on average, boys and girls perform similarly in math, boys are over represented among the very best performers as well as the very worst. Teachers have found that when certain types of teaching (such as experiments that reflect daily life), work for girls, they generally work for boys as well.

Although little difference in mathematics performance was found among younger students, a study of students grade 1–3 by Fennema et al. noted that significant differences in problem-solving strategies were found, with girls tending to use more standard algorithms than the boys. They suggest that this may be due to both the teachers' stereotypical beliefs about mathematics and gender, as well as the study's design permitting "the children's stereotypical beliefs to influence strategy use and thus the development of understanding in these classrooms". A study conducted at Illinois State University examined the effects of gender stereotypes on the teaching practices of three third grade teachers, noting that "[the teachers] claimed gender neutrality, yet they expressed numerous beliefs about gender difference during the study", such as allowing boys (but not girls) to respond to questions without raising their hand or providing reading selections that promoted women in non-traditional roles, but not doing the same for men.

Overall, differences in student performance that arise from gender tend to be smaller than that of other demographic differences, such as race or socioeconomic class. The results of the 1992 NAEP 12th grade science tests, on a 500-point scale, show that the differences of scores between white and African American students were around 48 points, while differences between male and female students were around 11 points.

=== Media ===
Social gender construction (specifically for younger audiences) is also influenced by media. In the 21st century, modern technology is abundant in developed countries. In 2018, roughly 42% of tweens and teens experience feelings of anxiety when not near their phones. There is a growing amount of teens that spend an average of 6.5 hours on media daily. This data reflects how much of a teenager's personality is dependent on media. Media influencing gender construction can be seen in advertising, social networking, magazines, television, music, and music videos.

These platforms can affect how a developing human views themselves and those around them. There is both positive and negative media and each type can be perceived differently. Media will often portray men and women in a stereotypical manner, reflecting their "ideal image" for society. These images often act as an extreme expectation for many developing teenagers.

Men are typically portrayed as assertive, powerful, and strong. Particularly in television, men are usually shown as being nonemotional and detached. Women are often portrayed as the opposite. Gender roles are generally more enforced for women in media than they are for men. Women are typically represented as the backbone of the household, the caretaker, and as stay at home mothers. Women in media are often given weak, dependent, and passive personalities. Media presence often perpetuates that men are not allowed to be caring and that women are not allowed to be strong and demanding. These gender influences from the media can mislead a growing child or teenager because while they are still trying to construct their identities and genders in a social environment, they are surrounded by biased influences.

The Internet reflects the values of offline society, and the jokes made online reveal the values and opinions reflected in those jokes, despite them being couched in humor. Memes are used to make sexist ideas into 'jokes', reinforcing sexist gender stereotypes, making threats against women, and mocking transgender people. Many of these views, when questioned or concerns are raised about them, are hidden, saying it was just a joke or a meme. However, memes and internet communities are also very common in feminist and transgender spaces, where jokes about gender are kinder and come from within the community rather than outside of it.

== Interactionist sociology ==
The interactionist analysis of gender began with Erving Goffman's The Presentation of Self in Everyday Life (1956), which offered an understanding of gender as a performance shaped by cultural parameters. Harold Garfinkel expanded on this episodic view in 1967, introducing the idea of gender as an ongoing achievement rather than a series of isolated events. Based on their work, Suzanne Kessler and Wendy McKenna famously proposed gender as an accomplishment. Their analysis, which was heavily based in the observation of transsexuality, was further developed by West and Zimmerman.

Accomplishment is "the activity of managing situated conduct in light of normative conceptions of attitudes and activities appropriate for one's sex category". People do not have to be in mixed gender groups or in groups at all for the performance of gender to occur; the production of gender occurs with others and is even performed alone, in the imagined presence of others. "Doing gender" is not just about conforming to stereotypical gender roles – it is the active engagement in any behavior that is gendered, or behavior that may be evaluated as gendered.

The performance of gender varies given the context: time, space, social interaction, etc. The enactment of gender roles is context dependent – roles are "situated identities" instead of "master identities". The sociology of knowledge must first of all concern itself with what people "know" as "reality" in their everyday, non- or pre-theoretical lives. In other words, individual perceptions of ""knowledge" or reality...must be the central focus." These performances normalize the essentialism of sex categories: by doing gender, we reinforce the essential categories of gender – that there are only two categories that are mutually exclusive. The idea that men and women are essentially different is what makes men and women behave in ways that appear essentially different. Though sex categorization is based on biological sex, it is maintained as a category through socially constructed displays of gender (for example, one could identify a transgender person as female even though she was assigned male at birth).

Institutions also create normative conceptions of gender. In other words, gender is simultaneously created and maintained – "both a process and a product, medium and outcome of such power relations". In his examination of blue and white-collar workers, Mumby argued that hegemonic or dominant masculinity provides a standard of acceptable behavior for men, and at the same time, is the product of men's behavior. This can be said for constructions of any identity in certain contexts (e.g. femininity, race, Black femininity, etc.).

People hold themselves and each other accountable for their presentations of gender (how they 'measure up'). They are aware that others may evaluate and characterize their behavior. This is an interactional process (not just an individual one). Social constructionism asserts that gender is a category that people evaluate as omnirelevant to social life. Gender as omnirelevant means that people can always be judged by what they do as a man or as a woman. This is the basis for the reasoning that people are always performing gender and that gender is always relevant in social situations.

Accountability can apply to behaviors that do conform to cultural conceptions as well as those behaviors that deviate – it is the possibility of being held accountable that is important in social constructionism. For example, Stobbe examined the rationale that people gave for why there were small numbers of women in the auto industry. Men cited the idea that such dirty work was unsuitable for women and women were unable to train because of family duties. Stobbe argues that the male workers created a machismo masculinity to distinguish themselves from women who might have been qualified to work in the auto shop. Women who do work in male-dominated professions have to carefully maintain and simultaneously balance their femininity and professional credibility.

Even though gender seems more salient in some situations – for instance, when a woman enters a male-dominated profession – gender categories also become salient in contexts in which gender is less obvious. For instance, gender is maintained before the woman enters the male-dominated group through conceptions of masculinity.

Race, class, and other oppressions can also be omnirelevant categories, though they are not all identically salient in every set of social relationships in which inequality is done. People have preconceived notions about what particular racial groups look like (although there is no biological component to this categorization). Accountability is interactional because it does not occur solely within the individual. It is also institutional because individuals may be held accountable for their behaviors by institutions or by others in social situations, as a member of any social group (gender, race, class, etc.). This notion of accountability makes gender dynamic because what is considered appropriate behavior for men and women changes and is reproduced over time and is reproduced differently depending on context. Gender is created in different ways among uneducated and educated African Americans.

Because gender is "done" or constructed, it can also be "undone" or deconstructed. The study of the interactional level could expand beyond simply documenting the persistence of inequality to examine: (1) when and how social interactions become less gendered, not just differently gendered, (2) the conditions under which gender is irrelevant in social interactions, (3) whether all gendered interactions reinforce inequality, (4) how the structural (institutional) and interactional levels might work together to produce change, and (5) interaction as the site of change.

== Gender performativity ==
The term gender performativity was first coined by American philosopher and gender theorist Judith Butler in their 1990 book Gender Trouble: Feminism and the Subversion of Identity. In the book, Butler sets out to criticize what they consider to be an outdated perception of gender. This outdated perception, according to Butler, is limiting in that it adheres to the dominant societal constraints that label gender as binary. In scrutinizing gender, Butler introduces a nuanced perception in which they unite the concepts of performativity and gender. In chapter one, Butler introduces the unification of the terms gender and performativity in stating that "gender proves to be performance—that is, constituting the identity it is purported to be. In this sense, gender is always a doing, though not a doing by a subject who might be said to pre-exist the deed".

In demystifying this concept, Butler sets out to clarify that there is indeed a difference in the terms gender performance and gender performativity. In a 2011 interview, Butler stated it this way:

When we say that gender is performed, we usually mean that we've taken on a role; we're acting in some way... To say that gender is performative is a little different, because for something to be performative means that it produces a series of effects. We act and walk and speak and talk in ways that consolidate an impression of being a man or being a woman... We act as if that being of a man or that being of a woman is actually an internal reality or something that's simply true about us, a fact about us. Actually, it's a phenomenon that is being produced all the time and reproduced all the time, so to say gender is performative is to say that nobody really is a gender from the start.

— Judith Butler, Your Behavior Creates Your Gender (2011)

Thus, Butler perceives gender as being constructed through a set of acts that are said to be in compliance with dominant societal norms. Butler is, however, not stating that gender is a sort of performance in which an individual can terminate the act; instead, what Butler is stating is that this performance is ongoing and out of an individual's control. In fact, rather than an individual producing the performance, the opposite is true. The performance is what produces the individual. Specifically, Butler approvingly quotes Nietzsche's claim that "there is no 'being' behind doing... 'the doer' is merely a fiction added to the deed – the deed is everything", (Note: The section in full runs: "To demand of strength that it should not express itself as strength, that it should not be a desire to overcome, a desire to throw down, a desire to become master, a thirst for enemies and resistances and triumphs, is just as absurd as to demand of weakness that it should express itself as strength. A quantum of force is equivalent to a quantum of drive, will, effect—more, it is nothing other than precisely this very driving, willing, effecting, and only owing to the seduction of language (and of the fundamental errors of reason that are petrified in it) which conceives and misconceives all effects as conditioned by something that causes effects, by a “subject,” can it appear otherwise. For just as the popular mind separates the lightning from its flash and takes the latter for an action, for the operation of a subject called lightning, so popular morality also separates strength from expressions of strength, as if there were a neutral substratum behind the strong man, which was free to express strength or not to do so. But there is no such substratum; there is no “being” behind doing, effecting, becoming; “the doer” is merely a fiction added to the deed—the deed is everything. The popular mind in fact doubles the deed; when it sees the lightning flash, it is the deed of a deed: it posits the same event first as cause and then a second time as its effect. [..] [O]ur entire science still lies under the misleading influence of language and has not disposed of that little changeling, the “subject” (the atom, for example, is such a changeling, as is the Kantian “thing-in-itself”); no wonder if the submerged, darkly glowering emotions of vengefulness and hatred exploit this belief for their own ends and in fact maintain no belief more ardently than the belief that the strong man is free to be weak and the bird of prey to be a lamb—for thus they gain the right to make the bird of prey accountable for being a bird of prey." – Nietzsche, GM (1887): I, §13) Thus, the emphasis is placed not on the individual producing the deed but on the deed itself, and its cessation becomes as problematic as the eagle rendering itself a mere lamb in Nietzsche's respective analogy. Butler, in fact, goes on to stress in their own words: “there is no gender identity behind the expressions of gender; that identity is performatively constituted by the very ‘expressions’ that are said to be its results”. Overall, they may be said to have been thoroughly influenced by Nietzsche's philosophy of subjectivity.

Interactionist sociology and gender performativity share a deconstructionist impulse, but diverge in their approach to the self. In West and Zimmerman's framework, identity is fluid and situational, but individuals manage to create a semblance of interiority over time. By contrast, Butler's theory emphasizes the failure of this process: the subject never fully realizes the identity that performance strives for. Thus, while interactionism highlights the social achievement of identity, performativity emphasizes its impossibility and perpetual instability.

=== Applications ===
==== Infancy and young childhood ====
The idea around gender performativity, when applied to infancy and young childhood, deals with the idea that from the moment one is conceived, arguably even before that, who they are and who they will become is predetermined. Children learn at a very young age what it means to be a boy or girl in our society. Individuals are either given masculine or feminine names based on their sex, are assigned colors that are deemed appropriate only when utilized by a particular sex and are even given toys that will aid them in recognizing their proper places in society. According to Barbara Kerr and Karen Multon, many parents would be puzzled to know "the tendency of little children to think that it is their clothing or toys that make them boy or girl". Parents are going as far as coordinating their daughter with the color pink because it is feminine, or blue for their son because it is masculine. In discussing these points, Penelope Eckert, in her text titled Language and Gender, states: "the first thing people want to know about a baby is its sex, and social convention provides a myriad of props to reduce the necessity of asking". Thus, this reinforces the importance and emphasis that society places not only on sex but also on ways in which to point towards one's sex without implicitly doing so. Eckert furthers this in stating that determining sex at one's birth is also vital of how one presents themselves in society at an older age because "sex determination sets the stage for a lifelong process of gendering". Eckert's statement points to Judith Butler's view of gender as being performative. Similar to Butler, Eckert is hinting to the fact that gender is not an internal reality that cannot be changed. What Eckert is instead stating is that this is a common misconception that a majority of the population unknowingly reinforces, which sees its emergence during infancy.

Butler suggests in both "Critically Queer" and "Melancholy Gender" that the child/subject's ability to grieve the loss of the same-sex parent as a viable love object is barred. Following from Sigmund Freud's notion of melancholia, such a repudiation results in a heightened identification with the Other that cannot be loved, resulting in gender performances which create allegories of, and internalize the lost love that the subject is subsequently unable to acknowledge or grieve. Butler explains that "a masculine gender is formed from the refusal to grieve the masculine as a possibility of love; a feminine gender is formed (taken on, assumed) through the fantasy which the feminine is excluded as a possible object of love, an exclusion never grieved, but 'preserved' through the heightening of feminine identification itself".

==== Teen years ====
One's teen years are the prime time in which socialization occurs as well as the time in which how one presents themselves in society is of high concern. Often, this is the time in which one's ability to master their gender performance labels them as successful, and thus normal, or unsuccessful, and thus strange and unfitting. One of the sources that demonstrate how successful performance is acted out is magazines, specifically magazines targeting young girls. According to Eckert, "When we are teenagers, the teen magazines told girls how to make conversation with boys...". This not only emphasizes the fact that gender is something that is taught to us and is continuously being shaped by society's expectations, but it also points to one of the ways in which individuals are being subconsciously trained to be ideal participants in the gender binary. Thus calling back to Butler's perception that gender is not a fact about us but is something that is taught to us and is being constantly reinforced. This idea that gender is constantly shaped by expectations is relevant in the online community. Teenagers are easily able to formulate relationships and friendships online, thus increasing the probability of a teenager's delicate identity to be manipulated and distorted. Teenagers often come across situations in real life and online that cause them to question themselves when facing society, including gender performance.

==== Queer identity ====
The Butlerian model presents a queer perspective on gender performance and explores the possible intersection between socially constructed gender roles and compulsory heterosexuality. This model diverges from the hegemonic analytical framework of gender that many claim is heteronormative, contending with the ways in which queer actors problematize the traditional construction of gender. Butler adapts the psychoanalytical term of melancholia to conceptualize homoerotic subtext as it exists in western literature and especially the relationship between women writers, their gender, and their sexuality. Melancholia deals with mourning, but for homosexual couples it is not just mourning the death of the relationship, instead it is the societal disavowal of the relationship itself and the ability to mourn, thus leading to repression of these feelings. This idea is reflected in the activism organized by political groups such as ACT UP during the AIDS crisis. Many of the survivors that participated in this activism were homosexuals who had lost their partners to the disease. The survivors commemorated the dead by quilting together their rags, repurposing their possessions, and displaying their own bodies for premature mourning. All of these protests amounted to a message that some part of them will be left in the world after they have expired.

== Debates and criticism ==
=== Evolutionary psychology ===
The work The Blank Slate of Harvard psychologist Steven Pinker, argues for the existence of socially constructed categories such as "money, tenure, citizenship, decorations for bravery, and the presidency of the United States" which "exist only because people tacitly agree to act as if they exist." However they are not in support of social constructionism as the sole means of understanding reality, rather as a specific context for specific phenomena, and support the consideration of empirical scientific data in our understanding of the nature of human existence. In this manner, Pinker explicitly contradicts social constructionist scholars Marecek, Crawford & Popp who in "On the Construction of Gender, Sex, and Sexualities", argue against the idea that socially organized patterns can emerge from isolated origins and favor instead the theory of Tabula rasa, which states that knowledge and meaning are generated exclusively as a collective effort and that the individual is incapable of doing so independently. In essence, the creation of meaning is a shared effort even when achieved by an individual in solitary conditions, because individuality is an illusion found at the intersection of myriad external influences being filtered through Id, Ego, and Super-ego.

=== Feminist theory ===
Originally developed outside the feminist movement, the modern concept of gender was diffused by second-wave feminism as a tool against biological determinism. However, there are feminist theorists who question its usefulness for the purposes of feminism. Elizabeth Grosz, for example, argues that the sex–gender distinction maintained by some constructionist feminists is essentialist, and that the naturalization of sex associated with the use of gender perpetuates biological determinism. A similar critique can be found in French materialist feminism.

=== Transgender studies ===
In "Boys of the Lex" (2006), Gayle Salamon examines trans studies' affinity with feminist and queer theorizing of gender.

Trans writers have articulated at least three objections to social construction: it is simple where gendered embodiment is complex, it is inattentive to or dismissive of the reality of bodily materiality, and it offers no room for bodily resignification or resistance.

Such objections can be found in the works of Jay Prosser, Viviane Namaste, and Henry Rubin, often in relation to Butler's theory of gender performativity. Salamon interprets their arguments as misreadings of social constructionism, while Jack Halberstam identifies a "recommitment to essentialism within transsexual theory". Conversely, Susan Stryker affirmed that gender performativity "became central to the self-understandings of many transgender people" and is in line with Sandy Stone's posttranssexual call.

In Histories of the Transgender Child (2018), Jules Gill-Peterson criticizes the modern concept of gender as "a medical device mobilized to face the potential conceptual collapse of binary sex."

=== Masculinity studies ===
In the journal Continuum, Timothy Laurie argues that the notion of socially constructed "types" of masculinity - toxic, healthy, and so on - can still draw upon essentialist premises:

Attachments to preferred ‘types’ of masculinity can impede engagement with gender diversity and non-binary identities, unless the concept of ‘masculinity’ is actively deployed against the supposition of gender bifurcation. Such a move is commonplace in contemporary queer theory and transgender studies (among others), but continues to create tensions in the critical study of men and masculinities.

== See also ==
- Feminist metaphysics
- Gender schema theory
- Gender script
- Gender socialization
- Gender studies
- Materialist feminism
- Postgenderism
- Sex–gender distinction
- Simone de Beauvoir and The Second Sex
- Sociology of gender
- Transgender studies
- Transphobia
