= Sandra Bem =

American psychologist (1944-2014)

- Born: June 22, 1944; Pittsburgh, Pennsylvania
- Died: May 20, 2014 (aged 69); Ithaca, New York
- Education: Carnegie Mellon University, University of Michigan
- Known for: gender schema theory, Bem Sex-Role Inventory
- Scientific career
- Fields: Psychology
- Workplaces: Carnegie Mellon University, Stanford University, Cornell University

Sandra Ruth Lipsitz Bem (June 22, 1944 – May 20, 2014) was an American psychologist known for her works in androgyny and gender studies. Her pioneering work on gender roles, gender polarization and gender stereotypes led directly to more equal employment opportunities for women in the United States.

== Influences on the field of psychology ==
Bem was an American psychologist known for her works in androgyny and gender studies. Bem and her husband Daryl Bem advocated egalitarian marriage. The husband-wife team came to be in high demand as speakers on the negative impacts of sex role stereotypes on individuals and society. At the time, there was a lack of empirical evidence to support their assertions because this was uncharted territory, and so Sandra Bem became very interested and determined to gather data that would support the detrimental and limiting effects of traditional sex roles. In her early career, she was heavily involved in women's liberation movement, and she did work on sex-biased job advertising. Her involvement led to being a contributor to landmark cases concerning recruitment of women in the work force against companies such as AT&T and the Pittsburgh Press.

Early on in Bem's career she created the Bem Sex-Role Inventory (BSRI), which is an inventory that acknowledges that individuals may exhibit both male and female characteristics. The BSRI is a scale developed to determine what kind of sex role an individual fulfills. It is a self-report inventory that asks participants how well 60 different attributes describe themselves by using a seven-point scale. These attributes reflect the definition of masculinity (20 questions) and femininity (20 questions), and the remaining 20 questions were merely filler questions (Bem, 1993). In this inventory the feminine and masculine items were chosen on what was culturally appropriate for males and females at that time in the early 1970s. The BSRI was later used to measure psychological flexibility and behavioral indicators. Bem also developed the gender schema theory. According to the gender schema theory, "the child learns to evaluate his or her adequacy as a person in terms of the gender schema, to match his or her preferences, attitudes, behaviors, and personal attributes against the prototypes stored within it." This theory states that an individual uses gender as a way to organize various things in a person's life into categories. Her research questioned the social beliefs and assumptions that sex roles are opposite, bipolar, and mutually exclusive. The data she collected were supportive of a merging of male and female traits to enable a person to be a fully functioning, adaptive human over an emphasis on gender stereotypes.

She asserted that masculine and feminine dimensions could be divided into two spheres, rather than one: A person with high masculine and low feminine identification would be categorized as "masculine". A person with high feminine identification and low masculine identification, would be categorized as "feminine". A person who had high identification with both characteristics would be categorized as "androgynous". A person who has low identification with both dimensions would be considered "undifferentiated".

One of Bem's main arguments was that traditional gender roles are restrictive for both men and women, and can have negative consequences for individuals as well as society as a whole.

As previously mentioned, a person could be categorized as "androgynous" when taking the BSRI. Androgyny is defined as "the integration of both masculinity and femininity in a single individual". Androgyny allows one to freely engage in both masculine and feminine behaviors. According to Bem, people's behavior can demonstrate what she defined as situational appropriateness. Situational appropriateness is demonstrated when behavior is reflective of one's environment. For example, a woman demonstrating knowledge of sports at a basketball game is appropriate. Androgyny may also blend modalities. An example of androgyny blending modalities would be a woman being both assertive and compassionate when firing someone from a job.

== Awards and honors ==
Sandra Bem received many awards for her research. Her first was the American Psychological Association Distinguished Scientific Award for an Early Career contribution to Psychology in 1976. In 1977 she was awarded the Distinguished Publication Award of the Association of Women in Psychology and in 1980 she received the Young Scholar Award of the American Association of University Women (Makosky, 1990). In 1995, she was selected as an "Eminent Woman in Psychology" by the Divisions of General Psychology and History of Psychology of the American Psychological Association. Critics of Bem's work generally argued against the political nature of her theories and her objectivity in the material which she studied. Bem's work was revolutionary in that it directly challenged the traditional binary understanding of gender roles. At a time when women's roles were largely confined to the domestic sphere, Bem's research argued that these roles were not biologically determined but were the result of social conditioning.

== Education and career ==
Bem attended Margaret Morrison Carnegie College, now known as Carnegie–Mellon University, (1961–1965) and majored in psychology. She recalls the head of the counseling center, Bob Morgan, encouraging her to study to become a psychiatrist. This was the first time such a high-status career had ever been suggested to her. Subsequently, she entered the University of Michigan in 1965 and obtained her Ph.D. in developmental psychology in 1968. Her dissertation focused primarily on cognitive processing and problem solving with young children. Her main influence while at the University of Michigan was experimental psychologist David Birch. Her early work focused on the behavior of young children and their ability to solve problems, and utilize self-control and instruction.

After obtaining her Ph.D., Bem got a full-time tenure-track position as a professor at Carnegie-Mellon for three years and then moved on to work at Stanford University, where she worked until 1978. She left Stanford University because her application for tenure was denied. She and husband Daryl Bem both took tenured teaching positions at Cornell University in 1978, where she became a psychology professor and the director of the women's studies program. While at Cornell, Bem focused research on gender schema theory, sexuality, and clinical psychology until she retired in 2010.

== Personal life ==
Bem was born June 22, 1944, in Pittsburgh, Pennsylvania to Peter and Lillian Lipsitz. The Lipsitzes were of the Jewish working-class. Bem grew up with one younger sister, Beverly. Bem was raised by her parents in a government-subsidized neighborhood for the first eight years of her life. Both of Bem's parents worked throughout her life, so she grew up with the assumption that she would always be working. Her mother encouraged her to be the absolute best that she could be, and that "being just a housewife was not very desirable."

Bem's first career goal was to be a secretary like her mother, so that she could have her own phone and desk – symbols of autonomy and status that her father never had. During Bem's childhood, her mother had violent outbursts and fights with her father, causing her family much distress. Her mother was the dominant figure in her parents' relationship, and Bem recalls having a very tumultuous childhood, during which Mrs. Lipsitz would become extremely emotional while upset and throw objects during arguments. Bem also stated that she was quite unsuccessful in her attempts at flirting and dating with men, and so she internalized a belief that no man would ever want to marry her, which helped to solidify her career ambitions.

She eventually married Daryl Bem, also a psychology professor. The two met when she took his social psychology class at Carnegie–Mellon University. She was 20 years old at the time. She initially rejected his marriage proposal, having concerns about her own career. The two later agreed on an egalitarian marriage, in which they agreed to share in making decisions, doing household chores, supporting each other's careers, and performing parenting duties – all as equally as possible. With this in place, she consented to the marriage. After months of dating, the two were married on June 6, 1965. Much of Bem's family, including her mother, did not attend the wedding because it was a non-Jewish affair and they did not agree with this decision.

The Bems had two children together. They also had a grandson, Felix Viksne Bem (son of daughter Emily). While they eventually chose to live separately, they remained married until Sandra's death on May 20, 2014.

== Illness and death ==
Bem was diagnosed with Alzheimer's disease and, four years after diagnosis and after pursuing experimental treatments, she followed through with her plan to die by suicide at her home in Ithaca on May 20, 2014. Her husband, Daryl, was present with her when she died at 69.

== Works ==
- Bem, S. L. (1974). "The measurement of psychological androgyny". Journal of Consulting and Clinical Psychology. 42 (2): 155–162. doi:10.1037/h0036215. ISSN 1939-2117. PMID 4823550.
- Bem, Sandra L. and C. Watson. (1976). "Scoring packet: Bem Sex Role Inventory". Unpublished Manuscript
- Bem, Sandra Lipsitz; Martyna, Wendy; Watson, Carol (1976). "Sex typing and androgyny: Further explorations of the expressive domain". Journal of Personality and Social Psychology. 34 (5): 1016–1023. doi:10.1037/0022-3514.34.5.1016. ISSN 1939-1315. PMID 993980.
- Bem, S. L. (1976). "Sex typing and the avoidance of cross-sex behavior". Journal of Personality and Social Psychology, 33, 48.
- Bem, S. L. (1977). "On the utility of alternative procedures for assessing psychological androgyny". Journal of Consulting and Clinical Psychology. 45 (2): 196–205. doi:10.1037/0022-006X.45.2.196. ISSN 1939-2117. PMID 850004.
- Bem, S. L. (1977). The 1977 annual handbook for group facilitators.
- Bem, S. L. (1979). "Theory and measurement of androgyny: A Reply to the Pedhazur–Tetenbaum and Locksley–Colten Critiques." Journal of Personality and Social Psychology, 37, 1047.
- Bem, S. L., & Andersen, S. M. (1981). "Sex typing and androgyny in dyadic interaction: Individual differences in responsiveness to physical attractiveness." Journal of Personality and Social Psychology, 41, 74.
- Bem, S. L. (1981). "Gender schema theory: A cognitive account of sex typing". Psychological Review. 88 (4): 354–364. doi:10.1037/0033-295X.88.4.354. ISSN 1939-1471.
- Bem, S. L. (1981). "The BSRI and gender schema theory: A reply to Spence and Helmreich". Psychological Review, 88, 369–71.
- Bem, S. L. (1982). "Gender schema theory and self-schema theory compared: A comment on Markus, Crane, Bernstein, and Siladi's "Self-schemas and gender"". Journal of Personality and Social Psychology, 43,1192
- Bem, S. L. (1989). "Genital Knowledge and Gender Constancy in Preschool Children". Child Development. 60 (3): 649–662. doi:10.2307/1130730. ISSN 0009-3920. JSTOR 1130730. PMID 2737014.
- Bem, S. L. (1993). The lenses of gender: Transforming the debate on sexual inequality. New Haven, CT: Yale University Press.
- Bem, S. L. (1995). "Dismantling gender polarization and compulsory heterosexuality: Should we turn the volume down or up?". Journal of Sex Research. 32 (4): 329–334. doi:10.1080/00224499509551806. ISSN 0022-4499.
- Bem, S. L. (1998), An Unconventional Family. New Haven, CT: Yale University Press.
- Bem, S. L., Schellenberg, E. G., & Keil, J. M. (1995). "‘Innocent victims’ of AIDS: Identifying the subtext". Journal of Applied Social Psychology, 25, 1790–1800.
- Chesler, P., Rothblum, E. D., & Cole, E. ( 1995). Feminist foremothers in women's studies, psychology, and mental health. New York: Haworth Press.
- Frable, D. E. S. and Bem, S. L. (1985). "If you are gender schematic, all members of the opposite sex look alike". Journal of Personality and Social Psychology, 49, 459.
