= Sex Offenders =

1965 book by Paul Gebhard

Sex Offenders: An Analysis of Types
- Cover of the first edition
- Authors: Paul Gebhard, John Gagnon, Wardell Pomeroy, and Cornelia Christenson
- Language: English
- Subject: Sex offenders
- Publisher: Harper and Row
- Publication date: 1965
- Publication place: United States
- Media type: Print (Hardcover and Paperback)
- Pages: 923

Sex Offenders: An Analysis of Types is a 1965 book about sex offenders by the anthropologist Paul Gebhard, the sociologist John Gagnon, the sexologist Wardell Pomeroy, and Cornelia Christenson. It was a publication of the Institute for Sex Research.

Pomeroy writes that Sex Offenders was an "enormous and definitive volume" and that it met with good reviews. The child psychiatrist Robert Coles reviewed Sex Offenders in The New Republic. The book received a notice in the Harvard Law Review.
