= Sexual script theory =

Theory in sociology

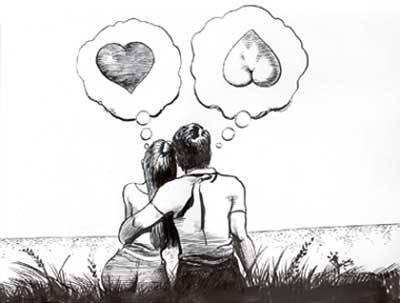
A dominant sexual script associates women with sexual modesty and men with greater initial enthusiasm for sex.

Sexual script theory is a sociological theory that states that sexual behavior is socially scripted, meaning that individuals follow social norms that inform their actions and perceptions. Under sexual script theory, different individuals—such as men and women—are assumed to have different expected roles in sexual situations, and to act in alignment with their expected roles.

The term sexual script refers to the social guidelines that dictate, similar to how the script of a play dictates to an actor, how individuals should understand sexual situations, and how they should act in those situations. Individuals may agree or disagree with sexual scripts. Among other influences, these guidelines are shaped by the law, stereotypes (especially gender stereotypes), and media including pornography.

Based in social constructionism, sexual script theory was first developed by American sociologists John H. Gagnon and William Simon in their 1973 book Sexual Conduct. Research on sexual script theory has found that major sexual scripts are gendered, and often especially pertain to adolescents and young adults. Research has also found that sexual scripts can be used to understand issues related to sexual health and consent.

== Overview ==
Scripts are social functions that guide individuals' actions and perceptions regarding appropriate behavior. The script is a cognitive schema that instructs people how to understand and act in sexual situations. There may be several people in the same situation, but they may differ in the roles that they have been given or have chosen to enact. Sexual scripts dictate what one should be doing at a particular time and in a particular place, if one is to play the role characteristically associated with that script. Sexual script theory is founded on the idea that the subjective understandings of each person about their own sexuality substantively determine that person's choice of sexual actions and their subsequent qualitative experience of those sexual acts.

Sexual script theory is based in social constructionism, which posits that "the interpretation of reality, including human behavior, is derived from shared beliefs within a particular social group". In turn, sexual script theory posits that "sexuality is learned from culturally available messages that set guidelines regarding sexual behavior and activities", and that "people learn scripts as a function of being raised in a particular culture". Human sexual behavior and the meanings attached to those behaviors, including what makes them "sexual" behaviors, derives from metaphorical scripts individuals have learned and incorporated as a function of their involvement in the social group.

Gagnon and Simon, who originated sexual script theory, state that "for behavior to occur, something resembling scripting must occur on three distinct levels: cultural scenarios, interpersonal scripts, and intrapsychic scripts." Cultural scenarios, shaped by cultural institutions, provide context for roles. Interpersonal scripts "rest on the roles and general circumstances provided by cultural scenarios"; individuals' interpersonal scripts are created by adapting general cultural guidelines. Intrapsychic scripts "may entail specific plans or strategies for carrying out interpersonal scripts", including "fantasies, memories, and mental rehearsals".

Sexual scripts are shaped by the structure and rules of a society, including marriage laws, vows, and laws against certain sexual behaviors or relationships. In most Western cultures, sexual scripts are "markedly different" for male and female individuals.

== Development ==
Sexual script theory was introduced by American sociologists John H. Gagnon and William Simon in their 1973 book Sexual Conduct: The Social Sources of Human Sexuality. The theory emerged as a "logical extension" of symbolic interactionism, which "focuses on how meaning is created, modified, and put into action by individuals in the process of social interaction." Gagnon and Simon's work was also preceded by that of sociologist Erving Goffman, who had used dramaturgy to liken human social interaction to the performance of assumed roles in a theatrical production. Simon and Gagnon were also preceded by sex researchers Alfred Kinsey, and Willam Masters and Virginia Johnson.

At the theory's creation, Simon and Gagnon noted that "their perspective was a reaction to the dominant theoretical views of human sexuality at the time: psychoanalytic and biological". Dominant perspectives had dictated that sexual behavior was determined by instincts or drives, and inherently tied to human biology. Sigmund Freud had established his psychoanalytic theory towards life and procreation (libido). Freudian psychoanalytic perspectives on sexuality continued to be influential even as biological perspectives were popularized.

Sexual script theory came about during the rise of social constructionism in the 1960s and 1970s, a time in which researchers felt cultural events called into question essentialist perspectives. Simon and Gagnon considered sexual scripts as interwoven with gender scripts, which had been developed in feminist scholarship around that time.

== Research ==
Research on sexual scripts and sexual script theory has concluded that sexual scripts are organized through gender, class, ethnicity, and other social vectors.

=== Gender ===
Research on sexual scripts and sexual script theory has concluded that sexual scripts are gendered. Gender scripts, under gender schema theory, "possess a gender-role component defining which sex typically performs [an event sequence]". In Western cultures, sexual scripts for women and men differ, often complementing one another. These differences are often considered a double standard. Gendered sexual scripts are exhibited in mainstream media, and they especially affect adolescents and young adults.

Traditional gender stereotypes, which inform sexual scripts, "associate maleness and masculinity with assertiveness, aggressiveness, sexual adventurism, and emotional restraint, and femaleness and femininity with docility, passivity, sexual modesty, and emotional intimacy". For example, in heterosexual relationships, it is customary for the male to present greater initial enthusiasm for sex. Due to social norms, as well as stereotypes about male sexuality, a man may fear that his masculinity, sexual prowess, and fertility may be questioned if he does not exhibit sexual passion early in the relationship. Conversely, a woman may be cautious about expressing sexual enthusiasm early in a relationship due to related social norms and stereotypes about female sexuality.

Among young men, "sexual activity is goal directed (toward self-pleasure and tension release) and easily divorced from the more general relationship to one's partner", while this activity for women is viewed as "potentially dangerous" to one's body and reputation. Gender scripts may also affect product design, such as in the development of different types of razors for men and women.

=== Age ===
For sexual scripts, major cultural scenarios tend to be almost exclusively related to adolescence and early adulthood. Common scripts relate to and may vary by age, with adolescence and early adulthood being the stages in which "individuals develop and refine their interpersonal and intrapsychic sexual scripts". Fewer sexual scripts are associated with other life stages; "sexually significant events" are rarely associated with those in the childhood ("presexual") or old-age ("postsexual") stages.

Children tend to have a better understanding of their own sex's scripts and characteristics than those of another sex. From an early age, men are often raised to embrace their sexuality, while women are usually encouraged to suppress it. While young boys are taught to hold their penis to urinate and to handle it for purposes of washing, girls are taught not to touch their clitoris.

=== Race and ethnicity ===
There are differences among racial and ethnic groups in relation to sexual scripts. In studies comparing Hispanic and White young adults' sexual practices, it is revealed that while both parties tend to conform to gender-typed scripts in their romantic relationships, Hispanics seem to be more adhering to structured and gender-typed scripts, where men have to take initiative and carry out more actions compared to women.Among Black heterosexual men, cultural scripts of sexual performance affect sexual risk-taking behaviors, which is relevant for understanding HIV transmission in these populations. It was found that for African-American and Hispanic women, culturally grounded scripts can contribute to normalizing partners' infidelity and minimizing women's necessity for negotiating safe sex practices.

=== Romantic scripts ===
Romantic scripts refer to cultural understandings regarding patterns of behavior expected in romantic relationships, ranging from who initiates dating and who pays for dates to how intimacy is expected to progress over time. Like sexual scripts, romantic scripts are strongly intertwined with gender roles; research has shown that heterosexual dating scripts remain highly gender-typed, with men expected to lead romantic encounters while women are cast in a more passive role.The relationship between sexual and romantic scripts is also significant, as individuals' expectations about dating and courtship frequently shape and constrain their sexual behavior. Although attitudes toward romance have become increasingly egalitarian, research suggests that behaviors have been slower to change, with young adults continuing to expect men to initiate sexual contact and cover the costs of dating even when they ideologically support gender equality.

=== Sexual assault and consent ===
The rape script is defined as stereotypes or false beliefs about rape, its victims, and rapists. Rape stereotypes are heavily influenced by religion, law, and the media. The rape script may describe rape as a violent act done to a woman by a male stranger. Victims of rape may look to the rape script to determine whether they have experienced rape. These scripts may lead to victim-blaming, especially for "women and girls who do not follow society's traditional gender scripts, such as those who drink alcohol and/or who are sex workers".

Women who agree with the sexual script may learn to suppress their sexual desires and begin viewing themselves as sexual objects; men who agree are more likely to agree with rape myths and the objectification of women. They are also more likely to believe in "token resistance", the idea that women who say "no", really mean "yes".

Drawing upon conversation analysis, Hannah Frith and Celia Kitzinger write that discussion of sexual encounters may be considered scripted if the speaker uses any of these five linguistic devices: references to predictable stages, references to common knowledge, production of consensus through seamless turn-taking and collaborative talk, use of hypothetical and general instances, or active voicing. By referencing sexual scripts in this way, "young women present the difficulty of saying no to unwanted sex as normatively difficult—as a commonplace, ordinary problem—such that they cannot be held accountable for their own specific difficulties, nor can negative dispositional attributes be made on that basis."

=== Sexual health ===
Sexual scripts influence sexual health decisions, such as the use of condoms. Women who abide by sexual scripts that promote women's submission may "lack the assertiveness skills needed to initiate purchasing condoms, providing condoms, and enforcing condom use". In heterosexual encounters, a prominent script dictates that men are responsible for the provision of condoms. This script, in addition to one that dictates that "women who suggest or carry condoms are promiscuous", discourages women from carrying or suggesting condoms. However, women are not necessarily evaluated more harshly than men when enforcing condom use.

Among men who have sex with men, there are sexual scripts regarding gender roles for tops and bottoms. Tops (those penetrating) are stereotypically associated with masculinity, while bottoms (those receiving penetration) are stereotypically associated with femininity. Issues with condom negotiation are related to unequal gendered power dynamics, with tops being more likely to dictate condom usage. Among young Black men in the Deep South of the United States, a sexual script assigns trade men ("typically masculine-looking men who have sex with both men and women") as more "risky" regarding HIV transmission, as they may avoid safe sex practices such as condom use.

=== Pornography ===
Pornography usually includes sexual scripts supportive of traditional masculinity, portraying men as sexually powerful, controlling, aggressive, and dominant. Pornography consumption leads to more sexual open-mindedness and a non-judgmental outlook on sexual behavior such as premarital sex, one-night stands, having multiple sex partners, and casual sex. This is especially true for male consumers of pornography.

Sexual media influences scripts as it can "provide consumers with scripts they were unaware of […], prime scripts they were already aware of […] and encourage the utilization of scripts by portraying particular sexual behaviors or general patterns of sexual behavior as normative, appropriate, and rewarding". Scripts in pornography can also designate "(1) what constitutes a sexual encounter, (2) what types of people should participate in a sexual encounter, (3) what events should or should not occur during a sexual encounter, (4) what verbal and nonverbal responses may be expected during an encounter, and (5) what possible consequences may occur when engaging in particular sexual scenarios."

== Criticism ==
American writer Rictor Norton writes that sexual script theory is an "inadequate tool for understanding sexuality", as he believes society is not the driving the force in understanding sexuality, and that sexuality comes from an individual's own desires and morals. Norton writes, "this behaviorist model is even more determinist than the biological model, which suggests that erotic desire is a powerful motive force arising from within, which has the capacity of resisting the social forces that would attempt to restrain or redirect it."

Legal scholar David Gurnham writes that the traditional heterosexual sexual script limits a woman's agency. He states that "consent-giving according to the traditional script presupposes a more passive role for women, with the consequent implication that males may feel that their scripted role entitles them to use deceptive or coercive means", and that this issue renders consent "invalid or at the very least severely compromised".
