= Doing gender =

Gender studies concept

In psychology, sociology and gender studies, "doing gender" is the idea that gender, rather than being an innate quality of individuals, is a social construct that actively surfaces in everyday human interaction. This term was used by Candace West and Don Zimmerman in their article "Doing Gender", published in 1987 in Gender and Society. According to this paper, an individual's performance of gender is intended to construct gendered behavior as naturally occurring. This façade furthers a system through which individuals are judged in terms of their failure or success to meet gendered societal expectations, called the accountability structure. The concept of doing gender was later expanded in the book Doing Gender, Doing Difference, edited by Sarah Fenstermaker and Candace West.

== Summary ==
The concept of "doing" gender came from conversations of gender from sociology and gender studies. The specific term "doing gender" was used in Candace West and Don Zimmerman's article by the same title, originally written in 1977 but not published until 1987. In the article, West and Zimmerman illustrate that gender is performed in interactions, and that behaviors are assessed based on socially accepted conceptions of gender. Rather than focusing on how gender is ingrained in the individual or perpetuated by institutions, West and Zimmerman emphasize the interactional level as a site where gender is invoked and reinforced. They begin by differentiating sex from sex category and gender. In this piece, sex is the socially agreed upon criteria for being male or female, usually based on an individual's genitalia at birth or chromosomal typing before birth. Sex category is the assumed biological category, regardless of the individual's gender identification. This is "established and sustained by the socially required identificatory displays that proclaim one's membership in one or the other category". Gender, in this context, is the degree to which an actor is masculine or feminine, in light of societal expectations about what is appropriate for one's sex category.

Doing gender according to West and Zimmerman "is to advance a new understanding of gender as a routine accomplishment embedded in every day interaction". Essentially, they argue that gender is something that humans created. As humans, we have categorized and defined many aspects of life. If someone was not in favor of their gender role or did something that was not deemed "correct" for that gender this person would be committing an act of social deviance. West and Zimmerman proposed that the two main aspects of "doing gender" are gender performance and accountability.

Gender is described as 'omnirelevant,' as it is apparent and relevant in almost every interaction. In their article, West and Zimmerman use examples such as bathrooms, sports, coupling, conversations, professions, and the division of labor to illustrate the ways in which gender is prevalent in many taken for granted activities. This description of gender's interactive nature is supported by Joshua and Kristin Smith (2016) where they explore what factors impact the process of "doing gender". West and Zimmerman employ the example of a professional woman in a male-dominated field, through which it becomes apparent that the woman will have to make decisions as to whether or not she should engage in "unfeminine" behavior that would otherwise be an integral part of her identity.

Notably, they cite the anti-trans Janice Raymond as their sole reference on transsexuality (p. 145).

Another component of this theory is gendered assessment of behavior. In the above example, the woman is engaging in behavior that will be assessed as either masculine or feminine by her co-workers. According to West and Zimmerman, this woman will be evaluated based on how her actions compare to accountability standards of the sex category she belongs to. Deviations from these expectations do not have an immediate effect on the accountability structure itself. Instead, failures to meet these standards are attributed to the individual rather than to the rigidity of recognized categories. With this theory, West and Zimmerman stress the importance of social interaction in maintaining the gender structure. Because individuals "do" and assess gender in interaction, gender is visible in a wide variety of activities such as conversation.

== Foundations ==
The idea that gender is something that individuals actively 'do' was largely inspired by the social psychological approach taken by Erving Goffman in "Gender Display". Goffman theorizes that humans make the assumption that each has an "essential nature," which can be interpreted by reading "natural signs given off or expressed by them".

One of the most basic natures that can be assumed from interpreting these signs is one's masculinity or femininity. Not only is gender often determined by others relatively easily, but this determination often establishes the ways in which individuals interact with one another. Goffman asserts that, because we habitually function within such scripts, they are taken to be further evidence of essential natures. He coins the term "gender display" as a way to conceptualize the ways in which individuals act in a gender appropriate manner.

However, these performances are optional and vulnerable to disturbance, as inappropriate gender display can just as easily be invoked as socially accepted ones. Goffman asserts that there is a "scheduling" of gender displays around activities, so that the activities themselves are not interrupted by gender displays. For instance, colleagues may interact in a gendered manner during their lunch hour, rather than while they are working together on a project. West and Zimmerman take issue with this piece of Goffman's perspective, claiming that this masks the ways in which gender displays permeate nearly all social situations in that individuals cannot avoid being interpreted as masculine or feminine. "Doing Gender" also comes into play in individual settings such as emotional, cognitive, or communicational behaviors interpersonally but also appears in interpersonal settings such as peer and familial relationships and their expected outcomes.

== Gender as a social transaction ==
In 1987, Deaux and Major proposed a model of social transaction to explain doing gender. In this model, there are three components or determinants for the social behavior of doing gender - the perceiver, the target, and the situation.

A perceiver interprets their observations of others through a social filter consisting of their expectations and attitudes. This leads to two types of confirmations. Cognitive confirmation occurs when a perceiver sees things in a way that confirms their preexisting beliefs. Behavioral confirmation occurs when the target changes their behavior based on perceivers' expectations. Together, these can lead to a self-fulfilling prophecy, where other people's beliefs about a person affect their actions toward that person, which in turn reinforce that person's beliefs about themselves and thus change their behavior in a way that confirms the people's beliefs. For example, a parent might treat their daughter as fragile and vulnerable because that's what they were raised to believe about girls. Even if the daughter did not possess either of those qualities at first, she might learn to believe those things about herself and adjust her behavior accordingly, only to confirm the parents' original belief.

A target is the person performing gender. When a target is focused on acting in a way that is consistent with their self-concept, it is referred to as self-verification. Self-presentation is the opposite, where the target is more focused on adjusting their behavior based on the opinions and attitudes of others. Self-enhancement is a type of self-presentation that especially focuses on presenting oneself favorably.

Finally, the situation refers to the effect of context on how one does gender. For example, the perception of an "appropriate" outfit can depend on the event, location, and setting. Dressing up for work will likely yield different results than dressing up for a beach party. A perceiver's gender schema may be activated by the situation, such as when a person is told that a particular toddler is a boy, the perceiver often reaches for cars and robots to play with the toddler, because a common gender schema dictates that boys like to play with those types of toys. A wedding presents a situation in which there tend to be very specific and rigid expectations and pressures relating to gender.

== Responses and critiques ==
The concept of doing gender has been critiqued by scholars who assert that it does not take human agency and acts of resistance into account. In order to illustrate the possibility of change, several works have been published in which researchers claim to document an 'undoing' or 'redoing' of gender. Francine M. Deutsch, in "Undoing Gender" (2007), examines how the concept of doing gender has been employed in research. Deutsch uses examples of studies that use West and Zimmerman's work to illustrate how normative gender ideals are apparent in a variety of contexts. This, she argues, contributes to the invisibility of gender transgression and does not work towards West and Zimmerman's goal of eliminating gender inequity. In order to facilitate the undoing of gender, Deutsch suggests that "The study of the interactional level could expand beyond simply documenting the persistence of inequality to examine (1) when and how social interactions become less gendered, not just differently gendered; (2) the conditions under which gender is irrelevant in social interactions; (3) whether all gendered interactions reinforce inequality; (4) how the structural (institutional) and interactional levels might work together to produce change; and (5) interaction as the site of change." By focusing on these areas, Deutsch asserts, it is easier to find practical solutions to problems cause by gender inequity.

In January 2009, the academic journal Gender and Society published a West and Zimmerman Symposium, in honor of the concept of doing gender. Nine short articles were composed for the symposium, including a piece by West and Zimmerman. Several authors argued that the doing gender framework did not allow for agency, intent or consciousness. Other authors argued that biology needed to be focused on when considering doing gender, in order to understand what role the body plays in gender assessment.

West and Zimmerman responded with an article titled "Accounting for Doing Gender", in which they restated their original argument, with an emphasis on accountability. In this, they argued, the doing gender framework does not hide agency, but contextualizes it. Because individuals' gender will be interpreted based on the accountability structure, the effectiveness of their resistance may not serve to "undo" gender. The authors contend that gender may be "redone" but never "undone", as accountability structures may change but gender will not disappear.

The 'doing gender' framework, developed by West and Zimmerman, is highly influential in housework research.

A 2009 article by Kristen Schilt and Laurel Westbrook expands upon West and Zimmerman's initial framework for "doing gender" by emphasizing how it is impacted by heteronormativity. They claimed that heterosexual norms were disrupted when biological sex and "doing gender" differed, due to the perception of a natural way to be male or female. Notably, the article uses terms related to gender and terms related to sex synonymously, and deadnames murdered trans women of color without scholarly justification (pp. 454, 457). The argument that arose based on these findings was that biological sex instructs people on how they should do gender. Sonny Nordmarken supports this argument by suggesting that people learn to express themselves based on the social expectation that gender and biological sex must match. He also discusses how people are taught to use physical appearance, such as secondary sex traits, to determine other people's gender. Schilt and Westbrook suggest that the binary sex system and hierarchical gender system lead to the process of "doing inequality" through "doing gender", with masculinity and heterosexuality being anointed as the desired, therefore privileged identities. They also explain that various time periods and regions of the world have different standards and norms according to how the sex and gender systems have been enacted there. In a later work, Westbrook and Schilt support West and Zimmerman's suggestion that determining gender relies upon cues provided through "doing gender".

Catherine Connell presented the idea of "redoing gender" as well as "doing transgender" in her work, "Doing, Undoing or Redoing Gender? Learning from the Workplace Experiences of Transpeople". Connell posits that trans people may redo gender by altering normative ideas of gender in their interactions, but may simultaneously participate in the doing of gender in other ways. Connell coins the term "doing transgender" in order to provide a way to examine how trans people must make sense of the disconnect between sex, gender and sex category, which they may obscure or actively express in interactions.

Jocelyn Hollander's 2013 work focuses on accountability, where she argues that it has three parts: "orientation", "assessment", and "enforcement". Hollander describes orientation as self-accountability to biological sex. Assessment is explained as the process of measuring an individual's way of doing gender in comparison to their sex. Hollander states that assessment holds people accountable to themselves and others. The third part is enforcement, which is when someone is actively held accountable to societal norms.

A 2016 article by J. Smith and K. Smith references the role of accountability and states that the act of "doing gender" is verified according to established standards for a specific circumstance. Determining gender is regarded as a subjective behaviour based on an individual's personal views and experiences, according to the aforementioned sources.

Helana Darwin extends the "doing gender" framework to include challenges faced by nonbinary individuals within the binary gender system. The author references West and Zimmerman's and Hollander's focus on accountability. She states that their proposed systems of accountability are used to justify the argument that "doing gender" is compulsory, however, Darwin contends that they fail to consider the impact of social change. Additionally, she critiques the focus on the gender binary in the original framework and other responses. The author furthers Connell's framework by focusing on nonbinary gender identities rather than binary transgender identities. Darwin suggests that using the term "transgender" to encompass both binary and nonbinary transgender people fails to account for their different experiences in society, particularly in regards to the gender binary. She argues that binary transnormativity prevents authentic gender expression for nonbinary individuals. Through her research, Darwin concluded that there are a multitude of ways one may "do nonbinary gender", largely due to the many different nonbinary gender identities. She discovered that some nonbinary individuals intentionally use conflicting binary gender signals to fluctuate between these binary categories. Much of Darwin's studies focused on genderqueer individuals, who she deemed disruptive to the accountability component of the "doing gender" framework. She argued that genderqueer people refute the belief that everyone holds themselves accountable to the gender binary.

Nordmarken proposes the idea that social interactions are not only significant in "doing gender", but also in "undoing gender". In drawing upon West and Zimmerman and Barbara Risman, he acknowledged their argument that for gender to truly be undone would be for it to have no meaning. Both articles suggest that reproductive expectations associated with biological sex would remain intertwined with gender identity. Due to this, they discuss the idea of "redoing gender" instead. Nordmarken critiques these works for failing to consider "doing gender" outside of a hegemonic framework, which excludes populations who do not hold themselves accountable to binary ideals. The author explored "doing gender" through a "queer trans paradigmatic" lens where he observed people being allowed to inform others of their identity, rather than having others making assumptions based on body-related cues. In particular, he reported the impact of pronouns on "doing gender". He suggested that using pronouns de-emphasize people's accountability to gender-related social standards, lessening the importance of gender norms and assumptions. He references the replacement of the body by pronouns for doing and interpreting gender as the queering of "doing gender". Nordmarken's focus on pronouns has added another layer of accountability to the "doing gender" framework where individuals are held accountable for proper pronoun usage. This directly opposes accountability to societal norms, providing a more collaborative, fluid approach to the "doing gender" framework.

== Doing difference ==
Doing difference is a concept that grew out of the authors' earlier idea of doing gender. In 1995, Candace West and Sarah Fenstermaker identified gender, race, and class as the three fundamental means of categorizing social difference. They sought to extend the idea of gender as an ongoing interactional process into the realms of race and class by asserting that the intersection of these three categories could not be thought of in strictly a mathematical or hierarchical sense. That is, equating these concepts to variables in a statistical model tasked with predicting life success in society will result in an inadequate understanding of systemic inequalities based on race, class, and gender.

The authors also highlight how simply placing communities facing immense social disadvantages, such as poor black women, at the bottom of an abstract listing of vulnerable populations in the United States offers little information about how the interaction of race, class, and gender constrains and directs various aspects of their lives. Their analysis of these core differences from an ethnomethodological standpoint shifts the focus away from individual characteristics. Instead, they are understood processually as "emergent properties of social situations" which simultaneously produce systematically different outcomes for social groups and the rationale for such disparities.

The authors assert that the reason race and class were not adequately considered in earlier works is because the feminist movement has historically been the province of white middle-class women in the developed world who were not sufficiently affected or attuned to the nature of these corollary oppressions. Furthermore, few women outside this privileged lot were able to gain access to institutions of higher education, which might have permitted them to engage in the academic discourse and activity about such shortcomings. Even if they had, the gatekeepers within the academy and at leading journals made this unlikely process even more difficult. Perhaps overt racism and classism (and sexism) is less apparent today in these institutions, but the tendency remains for those in positions of power to view the world in a way that discounts the experience of marginalized groups.

The central theme of "difference" in this article intends to illustrate how the concepts of race and gender have been falsely conceived as biologically bound predictors of behavior and aptitude among those who of a certain skin color or sex. The commonalities within these somewhat arbitrary categories often exaggerated and the behavior of the most dominant group within the category (e.g. rich white men or women) becomes idealized as the only appropriate way to fulfill one social role. This conceptualization is then employed as a means of excluding and stigmatizing those who do not or cannot live up to these standards. This process of "doing difference" is realized in constant interpersonal interactions that reaffirm and reproduce social structure. Experiencing the world through the interaction of these "essentialized" characteristics and especially through dominant group's frame of reference (power interests) produces a pattern of thought and behavior that reproduces these social inequalities.

This theme has been further addressed by Karen Pyke and Denise Johnson (2003) where they integrated the concept of "doing gender" with the study of race. They explain that being part of racially or ethnically marginalized communities can lead to conflicting gender expectations from society and their own cultural values. The authors state that white society manufactures and normalizes racialized gender stereotypes for non-white populations. They reference how the aggressive images associated with Black women lead to the belief that they are not feminine enough, whereas the submissive representation of Asian women results in their hyperfeminization. The authors suggest that white dominance is reinforced using these derogatory representations of racialized individuals to manipulate them into "doing gender" in a way that emulates the idealized, white standards. Pyke and Johnson (2003) conducted a study with one section focused on how Asian American women do gender differently depending on their setting. These respondents viewed white femininity as the standard, with many citing mainstream guidelines which frequently glorify white femininity compared to Asian femininity. The authors also discovered how the hypermasculine representation of Asian men allow white men to be viewed as less oppressive. Pyke and Johnson (2003) focused on the influence internalized oppression has on how racially and ethnically marginalized populations "do gender".

West and Fenstermaker (1995) state that social science research has rendered dubious any claim that race can simply be conflated with color; gender with genitalia; class with paycheques. The authors acknowledge that class appears less prone to ideas about natural social differentiation, but argue that within capitalist societies, it is often assumed that one's economic situation acts as a direct indication of one's capacity to achieve, further engraining sexist and racist assumptions. Given the general observation that powerful groups display heavy reliance on these ideas of natural subordination, many liberationist thinkers have concluded that this essentialism would be a prime rhetorical vehicle to subvert. Thus, the deconstruction of role theory and functionalism within sociology was a central theme from the 1960s onward. This still left a somewhat gaping theoretical vacuum, one that continues to be felt by people struggling with the challenge of fundamentally altering their social cosmology.

Social constructionism has assumed the major explanatory role in these discussions by positing that the meanings of these supposedly ascribed statuses are in fact situationally dependent on the sort of social context in which we employ them. That is, race, class, and gender aren't just objective scientific facts, but dynamic processes of culturally constructing cues for moral behavior (for which one can be held personally accountable) in a particular circumstance. It is these constantly occurring processes, not a divinely decreed grand plan, which reproduces social structure. Individuals "do difference" when they acknowledge (knowingly or unknowingly) how their categorization renders them socially accountable to acting in a particular way in a situation. However, when individuals recalibrate "doing difference" to produce alternative ways to conceptualize interaction patterns, it amounts to social change.

== See also ==
- Judith Butler
- Role theory
- Symbolic interactionism
- Social construction of gender
- Sociology of gender
