= Gender schema theory =

Cognitive theory on how individuals become gendered in society

Gender schema theory is a cognitive theory to explain how individuals become gendered in society, and how sex-linked characteristics are maintained and transmitted to other members of a culture. The theory was formally introduced by Sandra Bem in 1981. Gender-associated information is predominantly transmuted through society by way of schemata, or networks of information that allow for some information to be more easily assimilated than others. The theory argues that there are individual differences in the degree to which people hold these gender schemata. These differences are manifested via the degree to which individuals are sex-typed.

== Sex typing ==
Sex typing is the practice of assigning certain skills and personality attributes to one of two sexes within the binary classification of gender. Thus, those skills and personality attributes are classified as either feminine or masculine. According to the gender schema theory, a child undergoes sex typing of themselves as they formulate their core gender identity. For example, a child might observe that their mother is consistently the person who does the dishes. This child will then conclude that doing the dishes must be a “feminine” action, adding this belief to their gender schema. If at this point the child is able to identify their own sex as female, the child will incorporate this observed “feminine” activity into their self-concept, deciding that as a female, they too must do the dishes simply as a result of being female. In this way, a self-concept becomes sex typed. Once a gender schema has begun forming, the child then seeks out other relevant information, evolving and further developing their gender schema. They process new information and their own behavior through the lens of their gender schema, resulting in sex typing of themselves and others in adulthood as well, which in turn can lead to prejudice and stereotypes.

According to the Bem Sex Role Inventory, there are four categories into which an individual may fall: sex-typed, cross-sex-typed, androgynous, and undifferentiated. Sex-typed individuals process and integrate information that is in line with their gender. Their femininity and masculinity scores are above the median on the sex-congruent scale and below the median on the sex-incongruent scale. Cross-sex-typed individuals process and integrate information that is in line with the opposite gender. Their femininity and masculinity scores are reversed - below the median on the sex-congruent scale and above the median on the sex-incongruent scale. Androgynous individuals process and integrate traits and information from both genders. Their femininity and masculinity scores are both above the median. Finally, undifferentiated individuals do not show efficient processing of sex-typed information. Their femininity and masculinity scores are both below the median.

== Gender stereotypes ==
Being that gender schema theory is a theory of process and not content, this theory can help explain some of the processes by which gender stereotypes become so psychologically ingrained in our society. Specifically, having strong gender schemata provides a filter through which we process incoming stimuli in the environment. This leads to an easier ability to assimilate information that is stereotype congruent, hence further solidifying the existence of gender stereotypes. Within adolescent development, it is hypothesized that children must choose among a plethora of dimensions, but that gender schemas lead to the regulation of behaviors that conform to the cultural definition of what it means to be male or female. Additionally, it is asserted that there is also a heterosexuality subschema, which likely encouraged the development of gender schemas. Most societies treat exclusive heterosexuality as the benchmark for proper masculinity and femininity—that is, heterosexuality is the norm. Furthermore, the heterosexuality subschema asserts that men and women are supposed to be different from one another. It is hypothesized that this is why cross-sexed interactions are likely to be sexually coded. Sex-typed individuals have a general readiness to invoke the heterosexuality subschema in social interactions, behaving differently towards individuals of the opposite sex that they find attractive versus unattractive.

== Evidence ==
Some of the early tests of gender schema theory came in the form of memory and other cognitive tasks designed to assess facilitated processing of sex-typed information. Much of this early research found that participants who were sex-typed remembered more traits associated with their sex, as well as processed sex-type congruent information more efficiently, suggesting that the gender schemata possessed by sex-typed individuals help to assimilate sex-associated information into one's self-concept. When given the option of clustering words by either semantic meaning or gender, sex-typed individuals are more likely to use the gender clustering system, followed by undifferentiated individuals. Cross-typed individuals had the lowest percentage of words clustered by gender.

== Social change ==
A strong source of sex-typing comes from the rearing practices of parents. The theory offers strong suggestions for preventing the sex-typing of children, including the prevention of access to media that promotes sex-typing, altering media and stories to eliminate sex-typing information, and modeling equal roles for mothers and fathers in the household. For example, in her original research, Bem edited the books that her children read to create a more androgynous view. This included, for example, drawing long hair and feminine body characteristics on male figures. Ultimately, however, this is somewhat limited because children will become exposed to some of this sex-typing information, particularly when they begin attending school. Therefore, Bem suggests teaching alternative schemata to children so that they are less likely to build and maintain a gender schema. Some examples include an individual differences schema, where children learn to process information on a person-by-person basis rather than make wide assumptions about groups based on information from individuals. Also, providing children with a sexism schema, where children learn to process sex-typed information through a filter that promotes moral outrage when sexist information is being promoted, can assist in providing children with the resources to not only keep from becoming sex-typed but also promote positive social change.

Bem wished to raise consciousness that the male/female dichotomy is used as an organizing framework, often unnecessarily, especially in the school curriculum. She stressed that the omnirelevance of gender has a negative impact on society, and that the gender schema should be more limited in scope. Within the feminist lens, androgyny is not radical enough, because androgyny means that “masculine” and “feminine” still exist. Rather, society should decrease the use of the gender dichotomy as a functional unit, and be aschematic.

== Legacy ==
The legacy of gender schema theory has not been one of obvious lasting impact in the psychology of gender. Bem's theory was undoubtedly informed by the cognitive revolution of the 1970s and 1980s and was coming at a time when the psychology of gender was drastically picking up interest as more and more women were entering academic fields. While gender schema theory does provide a cognitive backbone for how gender stereotypes may continue to be maintained in current society, it lost wind as more broad sociological theories became the dominant force in the psychology of gender. In 2017, Christine Starr and Eileen Zurbiggen published a follow-up on Bem's original research entitled: "Sandra Bem's Gender Schema Theory After 34 Years: A Review of its Reach and Impact". They found that while citations to gender schema theory have declined over the year, the development of her theory was also "a major contribution to psychology and that its generative reach extended well beyond the boundaries of [the] field." Another study found the theory "weak in its description", concluding that the process of sex-typing "requires clarification and elaboration".

The longest-lasting contribution to the field has been the Bem Sex-Role Inventory. Originally developed as a tool to identify sex-typed individuals, many researchers use the measure to look at other components of gender, including endorsement of gender stereotypes and as a measure of masculinity/femininity. Caution should be employed when examining research that uses the Bem Sex-Role Inventory for measuring constructs that it was not created to measure.

Bem herself admitted that she was ill-prepared to develop the Bem Sex-Role Inventory and never anticipated it being as widely used as it still is today.

== See also ==
- Gender script
- Social construction of gender
- Social role theory
