= Bem Sex-Role Inventory =

Inventory test used to research gender roles

The Bem Sex-Role Inventory (BSRI) is a measure of masculinity and femininity, and is used to research gender roles. It assesses how people identify themselves psychologically. Sandra Bem's goal of the BSRI was to examine psychological androgyny and provide empirical evidence to show the advantage of a shared masculine and feminine personality versus a sex-typed categorization. The test is formatted with 60 different personality traits which participants rate themselves based on a 7-point Likert scale. Traits are evenly dispersed: 20 masculine, 20 feminine, and 20 filler traits thought to be gender neutral. All traits in the BSRI are positively valued personality aspects. Numerous past studies have found that gender categorizations are correlated with many stereotypical gendered behaviors.

== History ==
"In the field of psychology, much research is conducted involving individuals' perceptions of gender roles, and behavioral as well as attitudinal correlates. Gender roles may be defined as "expectations about what is appropriate behavior for each sex". One can also add to this definition the expectations which are held about appropriate personality characteristics." The Bem Sex-Role Inventory was created by Sandra Bem in an effort to measure androgyny. It was published in 1974. Stereotypical masculine and feminine traits were found by surveying 100 Stanford undergraduate students on which traits they found to be socially desirable for each sex. The original list of 200 traits was narrowed down to the 40 masculine and feminine traits that appear on the present test. Normative data was found from a 1973 sample for 444 males and 279 females and a 1978 sample of 340 females and 476 males all also from Stanford University undergraduates.

Backtracking, however, the actual first scale that led to the creation of the Bem Sex Role Inventory was by Terman and Miles in 1936. The main thought behind it that brought about the idea of a measuring scale/test, was that males were thought to only have masculinity traits and personalities for it was natural to who they were. They couldn’t possess feminine personality traits. Likewise, women were only thought to be capable of possessing feminine traits and personalities, but couldn’t have any masculine ones.

== Scoring and interpretation ==
Participants are asked to rate themselves on each trait using a Likert scale. One indicates never or almost never true, while a seven would indicate always or almost always true. Originally androgyny was calculated by finding the t-ratio difference between masculine and feminine scores; however, in 1981 Bem advises users to utilize a split median technique for more accurate scoring.

The Bem Sex-Role Inventory offers four different possible resulting categorizations: masculine, feminine, androgynous and undifferentiated. Previously, an androgynous score was thought to be the result of equal masculine and feminine traits, while a sex-typed masculine or feminine score is the result of more traits belonging in one or the other category. The fourth type of score, undifferentiated, was seen as the result of extremely low masculine and feminine traits.

However, after the change in scoring technique, androgynous is the result of scoring above the median in both masculine and feminine categories. Sex-typed scores, masculine and feminine, are the result of scoring above the median in one gender and below the median in the other. An undifferentiated score is now a result of scoring below the median in both masculine and feminine categories. In other words, since scores are based on normative data, an androgynous classification occurs when a subject scores above 50% of the comparison group in both masculine and feminine categories, while a sex-typed classification is the result of scoring above half the comparison group in only one gender category.

What defines a typical male or female, in terms of characteristics, has drastically changed and in many instances there has been visible reduction in both males and females with their respective characteristics. On the contrary, both genders are actually identifying with more traits that are labeled under the opposite gender. With this change, the use of the scale, and others like it, are leading people to render more and more characteristics as neutral for both genders. This then throws off how the score is being accounted for, and how one's results will be concluded.

== Reliability and validity ==
The BSRI is very empirically sound. Bem reports coefficient alphas of .78 for femininity scales and .87 for the masculinity scale. BSRI, also has demonstrated high test-retest reliability.

However, since this is a self-report inventory, how reliable the assessment is depends on how accurately participants report their behaviors and attitudes. An androgynous score is the result of extremely high masculine and feminine scores, and an undifferentiated score is the result of extremely low masculine and feminine scores. It has been theorized that perhaps tendencies to rate oneself extremely low and extremely high on traits can affect a subjects' resulting gender placement.

The degree of reliability of each scoring technique is up for debate. When comparing the original t-ratio scoring (comparing the difference between the participant's Masculinity and Femininity scores to statistically typical differences between these) to the newly endorsed technique of classification based on scores falling above or below a sample's median score for Masculinity and Femininity, 42.3% of participants had a different resulting categorization. Since the median split method bases scores more heavily on sample characteristics, a participant can be categorized differently based on the sample of subjects with whom they take the test. For example, results may differ if the test was administered to a group of marines versus students at a private girls high school. This means that a person's classification will be dependent upon the group with whom they take the test. As stated by Elazar Pedhazur in a clip from his critique, "Bem concludes her discussion by stating, 'Finally, we urge investigators to further analyze their data without categorizing individual subjects in any way, i.e., through the use of multiple regression technique.' While endorsing what appears to be a suggestion to conduct studies within the framework of trait-treatment interactions, one cannot help wondering: Where has androgyny gone?"

With time, due to both changes in gender roles within the environment and beliefs, the initial result of the test, most of the time, doesn’t hold true. More people are tending to be more androgynous in their beliefs and personalities as they get older.

== Bem Sex-Role Inventory (short form) ==
The short form of the BSRI consists of 30 items. It has a strong .90 correlation with the original BSRI. This short form of the test allows for increased internal consistency. Bem reports similar masculinity coefficient alphas and higher femininity coefficient alphas with this form. The short form discards the traits "feminine", "masculine", and "athletic" from the self-report scales. Specifically, the short form removed some feminine traits that could be seen as less socially desirable such as "gullible" and "childlike". Masculine categories depict "assertive-dominance" and "instrumentality", while feminine categories depict "nurtureness-interpersonal warmth" and "expressiveness".

== Critiques ==
After an analysis and thorough investigation of 23 different studies having to do with the Bem Sex Role Inventory (BSRI), it was concluded that masculinity and femininity are more complex than can be captured by the BSRI measurement itself. While the BSRI can help, it should not be taken to self-diagnose as it may not capture all the criteria especially with changing times.

Additionally, the BSRI, based on findings, is still somewhat valid. However, it is mainly to be used lightly when assessing gender roles. This is due to traditional gender roles associated with either being masculine or feminine, weakening. As society is striving more towards equality, perceptions are changing on what both genders are capable of.

== See also ==
- Gender expression
- Sex and gender distinction
