= William Simon (sociologist) =

American sociologist (1930–2000)

William Simon (1930–2000) was a sociologist of human sexualities between 1970 and 2000. His co-authored book, Sexual Conduct: The Social Sources of Human Conduct played a role in shaping the contemporary sociology of sexuality and critical sexualities studies. His work helped formulate a theory of sexual scripting and he was an advocate of sexual tolerance. He was an early advocate of gay rights and testified against obscenity laws.

He "brought a postmodernist sensibility to a field long bound by historical assumptions", wrote the New York Times, describing his belief "that there are no fixed points in the geography of sexuality, merely an ever-changing terrain that has less to do with biology than with accidents of history."

== Life ==
William Simon was born on July 20, 1930, the son of Russian immigrants. As a child, he lived in the Bronx, before moving to Detroit in 1940. He dropped out of school in the eighth grade and became an assembly line worker. He was engaged in union activity and became a lifelong socialist. In 1951, despite his lack of formal education, he was accepted as a student by the University of Chicago on the basis of his poems. He discontinued his studies for financial reasons. In 1953, he attended the American Sociological Association's annual meetings and while speaking was noticed and invited to meet David Riesman and Nathan Glazer, who helped him gain admission to the University of Chicago's graduate program in 1955 where he met John Gagnon and earned his doctorate.

In the 1960s, Simon worked at the National Opinion Research Center (NORC) and taught at Southern Illinois University Carbondale. Between 1965 and 1968, he worked with John Gagnon at the Kinsey Institute for Research in Sex, Gender, and Reproduction. After this he worked at the Institute for Juvenile research in Chicago, becoming program supervisor in anthropology and sociology. Throughout the 1960s, Simon was very active in the civil rights movement.

He moved to the University of Houston in 1975 where he was director of the Urban Studies Institute (1975–7) and Professor of Sociology (1977–2000). He was active in the politics and arts community of Houston.

He had three sons: Marc David Simon, though his first marriage to Bernice Stark (1948–50); and Jonathan Simon and Adam Simon through his second to Marlene Bragman (1953–1968). His third wife, Lynn Randolph (1977–2000), a painter, survived him. He died on July 20, 2000, of cancer at the age of 70. His brother Myron Simon was a professor of English at the University of California at Irvine.

== Professional work ==
In his early career, Simon worked with John Gagnon at the Kinsey Institute of Sex Research as a researcher. Together they pioneered a sociological account of human sexuality. They rejected "the unproven assumption that 'powerful' psychosexual drives are fixed biological attributes" as well as "the even more dubious assumption that sexual capacities or experiences tend to translate immediately into a kind of universal 'knowing' or innate wisdom - that sexuality has a magical ability, possessed by no other capacity, that allows biological drives to be expressed directly in psychosocial and social behaviors."

Their work inspired many to think critically and seriously about human sexuality as a theoretical problem. Their influence has been acknowledged in the works of Jeffrey Weeks, Gayle Rubin, Jeffrey Escoffier, Michael Kimmel, Stevi Jackson, Ken Plummer and others. A key concept Simon and Gagnon formulated was that of sexual scripts: they developed the significance of scripts as a metaphor for understanding human sexualities. In their view, human sexuality far from being a simple biological drive should be seen as a socially organized sexual script. They wrote: "We see sexual behavior therefore as scripted behavior, not the masked expression of a primordial drive". From this, Gagnon and Simon proceeded to investigate three layers of scripting: historical and cultural, interactive and interpersonal, as well as its intra-personal or intra-psychic dimensions.

Looking at later separate contributions, Gagnon took a more empirical and sociological turn drawing from methodology and Durkheim) whilst Simon continued to have a more political bent whilst simultaneously showing a greater interest in intra-psychic scripting under the influence of the psychoanalytic works of Robert Stoller (1924–1991) and Heinz Kohut (1913–1981).

Simon's major ideas can be found in his final book, Postmodern Sexualities (2006). The irony of his work that while he spent much of his professional life trying to improve the social conditions of the sexual worlds of others, he was also trying to suggest that sex may not even be as important as people try to make it. It may indeed not harbor some grand truths of our life, society and being. As he said:

The most important permanent truth about sexuality is that there may be no important truths about sexuality that are permanent ... all discourses about sexuality are ultimately discourses about something else; sexuality rather than serving as a constant thread that unifies the totality of human experience, is the ultimate dependent variable, requiring explanation more often that it provides explanation.

His final paper was "The Fuzzy Matrix of 'My Type'".

== Honors ==
In 1986, he was awarded the Distinguished Contribution from the Society for the Scientific Study of Sex. The Sexualities Section of the American Sociological Association has awarded its John H. Gagnon and William Simon award for distinguished work in sexualities studies annually since 2001.

== Selected works ==
- 1996 Postmodern Sexualities, London: Routledge
- 1994 "Deviance as History: The Future of Perversion", Archives of Sexual Behavior, January 1994
- 1990 "Oral Sex: A Critical Overview", in June Reinsch, Vollmer, Godlestein, AIDS and Sex
- 1984 "Sexual Scripts," Society, vol. 22, no. 1, November–December, 1984, 53–60 (with John Gagnon)
- 1973 Sexual Conduct: The Social Sources of Human Sexuality, Chicago: Aldine Books, 1973 (with John Gagnon)
- 1969 "On Psychosexual Development," in David A. Goslin, ed., Handbook of Socialization Theory and Research New York: Rand McNally, 1969, 733–752 (with John Gagnon).
  - Reprinted in Trans-action, 6:5: March, 1969, 9–17, 17–23 (with John Gagnon)
- 1967 Sexual Deviance: A Reader, edited with an introduction written with John Gagnon, New York: Harper and Row, 1967
- 1967 "Homosexuality, The Formulation of a Sociological Perspective," The Journal of Health and Social Behavior, 8:3: September, 1967, 177–185 (with John Gagnon)
- Sexualities, vol. 4 no. 2, May 2001, contains a bibliography of his work
