= Gender script =

A gender script is a concept in feminist studies that refers to structures or paths created by societal norms that one is supposed to follow based on the gender assigned to them at birth. The American Psychological Association defines gender script as "a temporally organized, gender-related sequence of events". Gender script is also closely related to the concept of gender roles. Gender scripts have been called a demonstration of the social construction of gender.

== Concept ==
Feminist theorist Judith Butler writes gender should not to be considered "a stable identity or locus of agency from which various acts follow" but that gender is an identity shaped by "a stylized repetition of acts." This notion of gender as performative acts relates to gender script as gender script determines the necessary acts required to be a man or a woman. Butler also notes, "that the gendered body is performative suggests that it has no ontological status apart from the various acts which constitute its reality." That is to say, gender is constructed by these scripted acts and performances society places on its members. Psychologist Jean Malpas writes that children as young as two "have a good grasp of social norms and, in accordance with the developmental stages of gender constancy (Cohen-Kettenis & Pfafflin, 2003), are able to differentiate between a man and a woman, understand how boys and girls are supposed to look and behave, and pinpoint when something is out of line." Authors of the paper "Scripting Sexual Consent: Internalized Traditional Sexual Scripts and Sexual Consent Expectancies Among College Students" assert that "sexual scripts reflect the gendered power differentials in traditional gender roles."

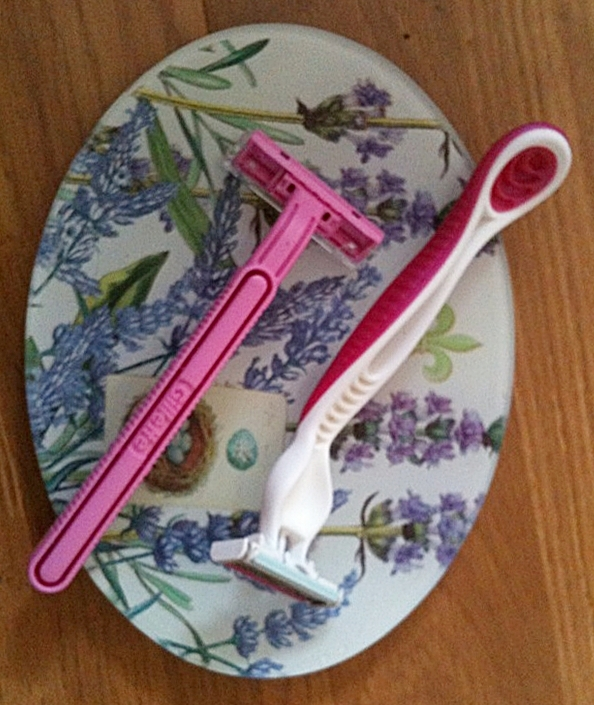
Pink razors are often marketed towards women, though they function the same as men's razors.

== Examples ==
Children's toys are an explicit example how gender scripts; toys designed for girls will be pink and toys designed for boys will be blue. Another example Oost gives is of razors and other shaving products, which tend to be pink or white for women, and darker for men—even though both products work virtually the same. Other technological examples include pink earphones for women, pink computers, and even pink guns. Pinterest is another example. In their article investigating the gender script of the site, scholars Amanda Friz and Robert Gehl demonstrate how specific aspects of the site is geared toward women, especially during the sign-up process.

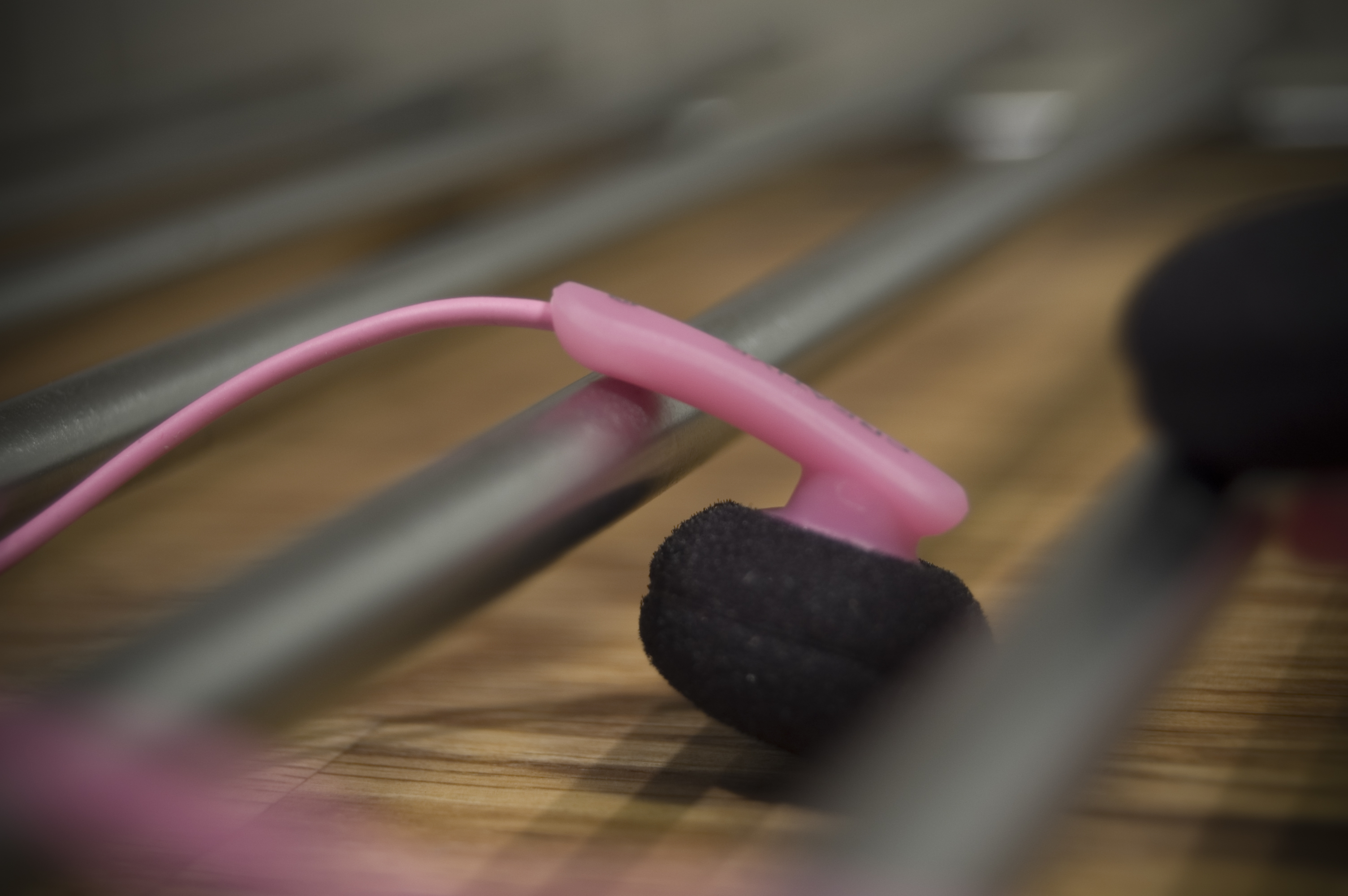
Earphones marketed to women

A specific example that looks at the feminization of an existing product is the process of redesigning cellphones to sell to a female audience. In the attempt to appeal to a female audience, both telephone technologies and design were altered. As mobile phones were first introduced to women in the 1990s, it was marketed as a tool for "remote mothering", or as safety devices for traveling. As cellphone use began to gain momentum, the design and marketing of mobile phones for females shifted to include branding the devices as "branded fashion accessories and as status symbols through limited edition haute couture items. Customization in the form of ringtones and wallpapers were deemed to appeal to a female audience, and thus introduced to the mobile market. The Nokia 7270 folding phone was a fusion of functionality, usability and fashion; it featured "chic, interchangeable fabric wraps... allow[ing] you to impulsively change your look as often and as boldly as you please". This sort of "trendy and impulsive consumption styles" were generally regarded as female consumption patterns. By doing so, Nokia was able to market their mobile phones (being that technology enthusiasm were usually regarded as typically a male interest) to a larger market.

== Critique ==
Gender scripts can be considered problematic because of its binary, exclusionary nature. Those who feel as though they cannot fit themselves into the specific societal requirements assigned to them, like non-binary or trans individuals, are left either feeling ostracized by society if they do not conform or they conform and are accepted, but are left unhappy.

Looking specifically at product and technology design, scholar van Oost notes, many objects are designed for "everybody", with no specific user group in mind. However, some studies have demonstrated that even in these cases, there may be an unconscious bias where designers base their choices on a one-sided, default male user image. This can be due to many factors. One factor could be the result of who is involved in design and engineering. On teams where men are the majority, they may use the I-methodology, where they only see themselves as the intended users. This can create a bias toward male-oriented symbols and interests. This can also happen at the level of user testing if the user testers are all male and nobody considers the user needs of all potential users.

== See also ==
- Gender schema theory
- Sexual script theory
