= John Gagnon =

American sociologist and sexologist (1931–2016)

- Born: John H. Gagnon; November 22, 1931; Fall River, Massachusetts, U.S.
- Died: February 11, 2016 (aged 84)
- Education: University of Chicago (BA, PhD)
- Occupations: Sociologist, sexologist
- Scientific career
- Fields: Sociology, sexology

John H. Gagnon (November 22, 1931 – February 11, 2016) was a sociologist of human sexuality who wrote and edited 15 books and over 100 articles. He collaborated with William Simon to develop the piece he is perhaps best recognized for: "Sexual Conduct: The Social Sources of Human Sexuality" (1973). He was Distinguished Emeritus Professor of Sociology at Stony Brook University, where he taught and from 1968 to 1998. In that same time frame, he also dedicated himself to advancing the field of sociology through his research.

== Life ==
Gagnon was born on November 22, 1931, in Fall River, Massachusetts. He became an undergraduate and graduate student at the University of Chicago in the 1950s, gaining his BA in 1955 and his PhD in 1969. After working as an assistant to the Sheriff in the Cook County Jail, he became a Senior Research Sociologist and Trustee at the Kinsey Institute for Research in Sex, Gender, and Reproduction at Indiana University in Bloomington, Indiana from 1959 to 1968. At the Kinsey Institute, Gagnon worked with his friend whom he had met in the midst of his graduate studies at the University of Chicago, William Simon - they started a brief but highly productive collaborative period. In fact, the aforementioned work, Sexual Conduct (1973), was developed during these years. Kinsey had been dead a few years and there was a sense of 'winding down' at the institute. Prior to the arrival of William Simon, Gagnon worked primarily on the Sex Offenders legacy project, the computerization of the original Kinsey sex histories and the maintenance of the Kinsey Archives and Library. After the arrival of Simon in 1965, in addition to the essays that made up Sexual Conduct, they started two major projects: a national study of sexual development among a national sample of college students and a major project on homosexuality. This was his induction into mainstream survey research, but it also set up a permanent tension in his work between conventional empirical research and the problem of theorizing sexuality adequately and taking seriously how social the sexual was. These ideas haunted him for the rest of his life.

Subsequently, Gagnon's major academic post was to be held at the University of New York at Stony Brook between 1968 and 1998, where he became a Distinguished Professor of sociology. During this time he chaired and sat on many committees and held many visiting positions at The Laboratory of Human Development at Harvard University; Churchill College, Cambridge; at the University of Copenhagen; and at the Universities of Essex, Princeton and Chicago. He worked on many leading projects connected with sexuality including the President's Commission on Obscenity and Pornography; chaired the SSRC-Ford Foundation committee on Sexuality Fellowships; and was a member of the National Research Council's CBASSE committee on the HIV-AIDS epidemic. In his retirement, he moved with his (second) wife, Cathy Greenblat, the sociologist and photographer, first to Nice and latterly to Palm Springs. Most recently he held a consultancy with the Laboratory of Robert Grant, Gladstone Institute of Virology and Immunology, San Francisco, California. Gagnon died on Thursday, February 11, 2016, from pancreatic cancer. Gagnon's autobiographical reflections on his life until 1973 can be found in Authors of Our Own Lives, edited by Bennett Berger (1990).

== Ideas and contribution ==
Gagnon is seen as the founder of a distinctly sociological approach to human sexuality. Michael Kimmel has called it 'revolutionary' and in a book devoted to articles inspired by the work of Gagnon, he claims that the book Sexual Conduct (1973) 'heralded the new paradigm from which all subsequent readings of sexuality in the social science and humanities have sprung' (Kimmel, 2007:pix). Gayle Rubin has also commented that Gagnon and Simon 'virtually reinvented sex research as social science' (Rubin, 2002: 28). Often linked to symbolic interactionism, but also tempered with Durkheim, his work has inspired and shaped a whole field variously called 'the constructionist approach to sexuality' Social constructionism or 'critical sexualities studies'. His ideas may also be seen as a precursor of 'queer theory' Queer theory. He has briefly summarized his own work thus: (1) Sexual conduct is entirely historically and culturally determined; (2) the meaning of conduct does not reside in a reading of the bodily activity of individuals; (3) sexual science is historically and culturally determined in equal measure; (4) sexuality is acquired, maintained, and unlearned in all of its aspects and is organized by social structure and culture, and (5) gender and sexuality are both learned forms of conduct and are linked differently in different cultures. (Interpretation of Desire 2004 p136).

Gagnon's contribution lies in four key fields.

- First, he pioneered an account of human sexuality that was not to be driven by an overwhelming prominence being given to the biological. With Bill Simon, he rejected 'the unproven assumption that "powerful" psychosexual drives are fixed biological attributes. More importantly, we reject the even more dubious assumption that sexual capacities or experiences tend to translate immediately into a kind of universal "knowing" or innate wisdom – that sexuality has a magical ability, possessed by no other capacity, that allows biological drives to be expressed directly in psychosocial and social behaviors.' (Psychosexual Development, 1969.) Much followed from this, as whole new field of analysis opened up.
- Secondly, and above all, Gagnon inspired many to think critically and seriously about human sexuality as a theoretical problem. Although he worked alongside the sexological profession, he remained very sceptical about its basic assumptions. (With Bill Simon, he developed the sociological theorization of human sexualities. Many ideas were formulated here, but the key was the significance of scripts as a metaphor for understanding human sexualities. Human sexuality far from being a simple biological drive should be seen as a socially organized script. We see sexual behavior therefore as scripted behavior, not the masked expression of a primordial drive. Psycho-sexual development 1969. Gagnon and Simon then proceeded to investigate three layers of scripting: historical and cultural, interactive and interpersonal, as well as its intra-personal or intra-psychic dimensions.
- Thirdly, having established a major social study of homosexuality at the Kinsey Institute, Gagnon challenged studies of 'homosexuality' to move away from the clinical and the pathological path, which dominated till the 1970s, towards the social and the political. "We have allowed the homosexual’s object choice to dominate and control our imagery of him" Formulation, 1967. A new approach was established which investigated the social and cultural situation of the homosexual. This was a little before the emergence of the Gay Liberation Front and marker events of the Stonewall resistance to police harassment.
- Finally, Gagnon was an early empirical investigator of the AIDS pandemic and his work helped shape an understanding of the role that different kinds of communities play in shaping the HIV and AIDS pandemic.

== Honors ==
Gagnon was an NIMH Post Doctoral Fellow in 1972–3, was made a fellow of the Society for the Scientific Study of Sex and subsequently received the SSSS lifetime achievement award for research into sexuality in 1981 and was President of the International Academy of Sex Research 1987–8. He was elected a Fellow of the American Association for the Advancement of Science. He was awarded an Honorary Doctor of Letters in 2006 from the Glasgow Caledonian University. He has been on the board of many professional and scientific committees connected with the study of human sexual conduct including the Presidents Commission on Pornography.

The Sexualities section of the American Sociological Association named its distinguished prize in sexualities studies as The John H Gagnon and William Simon award and it has been awarded annually since 2001. A Fetschrift in his honor was published in 2007 (The Sexual Self, edited by Michael Kimmel).

=== References and sources ===
- Bennett M. Berger Authors of their Own Lives (1992) University of California Press
- Jeffrey Escoffier (2004) Preface to Gagnon: An Interpretation of Desire University of Chicago Press
- Michael Kimmel The Sexual Self: The Construction of Sexual Scripts (2007) Vanderbilt University Press
- Gayle Rubin (2002) 'Studying Sexual Subcultures: Excavating the Ethnography of Gay Communities in North America' in E. Lewin and W . Leap Out in Theory: The Emergence of Lesbian and Gay Anthology. University of Illinois Press.

=== Selected publications ===
- 1965 "Female Child Victims of Sex Offenses," Social Problems. 13:2: Fall, 1965.
- 1965 Sex Offenders: An Analysis of Types. New York: Harper and Row, 931 pp. (with Paul H. Gebhard, Cornelia V. Christenson, and Wardell B. Pomeroy)
- 1967 "Homosexuality, The Formulation of a Sociological Perspective," The Journal of Health and Social Behavior. 8:3: September 1967, pp. 177–185 (with William Simon).
- 1967 Sexual Deviance: A Reader, edited with an introduction written with William Simon. New York: Harper and Row, 1967, 310 pp. (reprinted in JJ. Harper edition, 1969).
- 1969 "On Psychosexual Development", in David A. Goslin, ed., Handbook of Socialization Theory and Research. New York: Rand McNally, 1969, pp. 733–752 (with William Simon). Reprinted in Trans-action. 6:5: March 1969, pp. 9–17. 1969, pp. 17–23 (with William Simon
- 1973 Sexual Conduct: The Social Sources of Human Sexuality. Chicago: Aldine Books, 1973, 316 pp. (with William Simon)
- 1977 Human Sexualities. Glenview: Scott Foresman, 1977, 432 pp.
- 1984 "Sexual Scripts", Society. Vol. 22, No. 1, Nov. – Dec, pp. 53–60. (with William Simon).
- 1994 Sex in America. New York: Little Brown. (Co-author with Robert Michael, Edward Laumann, and Gina Kolata.) (Translations into Dutch 1995, German 1994, Japanese 1996, Chinese 1997).
- 1994 The Social Organization of Sexuality. Chicago; The University of Chicago Press. (Coauthor with Edward Laumann, Robert Michael and Stuart Michaels.) (Received the Gordon Laing Award for the book that added the most distinction to the list of the University of Chicago Press in 1995)
- 1995 Conceiving Sexuality: Approaches to Sex Research in a Post Modern Era. New York: Routledge, Inc. (Co-edited with Richard Parker).
- 1997 in Changing Times: Gay Men and Lesbians Encounter HIV/AIDS Chicago: University of Chicago Press. 1997, (Co-editor with Martin Levine and Peter Nardi).
- 2004 An Interpretation of Desire. Chicago: The University of Chicago Press, 2004.
- 2005 Sexual Conduct: The Social Sources of Sexual Conduct (Second Edition). Piscataway, NJ: Transaction Books, 2005 (1973 original with William Simon.)
- 2008 Les Scripts de la sexualité. Essais sur les origines culturelles du désir, préface d’Alain Giami, Paris, Payot.
