= Sex–gender distinction =

Difference between biological sex and gender identity

While in ordinary speech, the terms sex and gender are often used interchangeably, in contemporary academic literature, the terms often have distinct meanings, especially when referring to people. Sex generally refers to an organism's biological sex, while gender usually refers to either social roles typically associated with the sex of a person (gender role) or personal identification of one's own gender based on their own personal sense of it (gender identity).

Most contemporary social scientists, behavioral scientists and biologists, many legal systems and government bodies and intergovernmental agencies such as the WHO make a distinction between gender and sex. In most individuals, the various biological determinants of sex are congruent, and sex is consistent with the individual's gender identity, but in rare circumstances, they do not align, and the person may be transgender.

Though sex and gender have been used interchangeably at least as early as the fourteenth century, this usage was not common by the late 1900s. Issac Madison Bentley defined gender as the "socialized obverse of sex" in 1945. Sexologist John Money popularized this distinction beginning in 1955, but did not invent it. As Money viewed it, gender and sex are analysed together as a single category including both biological and social elements, but later work by Robert Stoller separated the two, designating sex and gender as biological and cultural categories, respectively. Before the work of Bentley, Money and Stoller, the word gender was only regularly used to refer to grammatical categories.

== Origins ==
The historic meaning of gender, ultimately derived from Latin genus, was of "kind" or "variety". By the 20th century, this meaning was obsolete, and the word gender was almost always used to refer to grammatical categories, although there are a small number of examples of gender being used as a synonym for sex prior to the 20th century, and even as early as 1474. This changed in the early 1970s when the work of John Money, particularly the popular college textbook Man & Woman, Boy & Girl, was embraced by feminist theory, though Money did not invent the concept. This meaning of gender is now prevalent in the social sciences, although in many other contexts, gender includes sex or replaces it.

As formulated by Money, gender is seen as an additional variable of sex. The later work of Robert Stoller, who innovated the term "gender identity", separated gender from sex as specifically cultural and biological categories, respectively, and treated them as "two different orders of data". Other studies have noted that, while there is some tentative evidence for a potential genetic, neuroanatomical, and hormonal basis for gender identity, the specific biological mechanisms involved have not yet been demonstrated.

== Dictionary definitions ==
The Oxford English Dictionary defines sex as "Either of the two main categories (male and female) into which humans and many other living things are divided on the basis of their reproductive functions". A further annotation exists on a separate definition stating that "The word sex tends now to refer to biological differences, while gender often refers to cultural or social ones."

Merriam-Webster defines sex as "either of the two major forms of individuals that occur in many species and that are distinguished respectively as female or male especially on the basis of their reproductive organs and structures." or "the sum of the structural, functional, and sometimes behavioral characteristics of organisms that distinguish males and females". They also note that "[d]octors can alter the physical characteristics of sex, but bodily sex does not determine gender."

The Cambridge Dictionary lists several different definitions of gender, such as "the condition of being a member of a group of people in a society who share particular qualities or ways of behaving which that society associates with being male, female, or another identity", or "the male or female sex, or the state of being either male or female".

In the Oxford English Dictionary, gender is defined as—in a modern and especially feminist use—"a euphemism for the sex of a human being, often intended to emphasize the social and cultural, as opposed to the biological, distinctions between the sexes", with the earliest example cited being from 1963. The Merriam-Webster Dictionary defines gender as "a subclass within a grammatical class (such as noun, pronoun, adjective, or verb) of a language that is partly arbitrary but also partly based on distinguishable characteristics (such as shape, social rank, manner of existence, or sex) and that determines agreement with and selection of other words or grammatical forms". The Britannica dictionary defines gender as "a person's own sense of being male, female, some combination of male and female, or neither male nor female". The American Heritage Dictionary (5th edition) states that gender may be defined by identity as "neither entirely female nor entirely male"; its Usage Note adds:

Some people maintain that the word sex should be reserved for reference to the biological aspects of being male or female or to sexual activity, and that the word gender should be used only to refer to sociocultural roles. ... In some situations this distinction avoids ambiguity, as in gender research, which is clear in a way that sex research is not. The distinction can be problematic, however. Linguistically, there isn't any real difference between gender bias and sex bias, and it may seem contrived to insist that sex is incorrect in this instance.

== Scientific use ==
=== In biology ===
Anisogamy, or the size differences of gametes (sex cells), is the defining feature of the two sexes. By definition, males are organisms that produce small, mobile gametes (sperm); while females are organisms that produce large and generally immobile gametes (ova or eggs). Richard Dawkins stated that it is possible to interpret all the differences between the sexes as stemming from this single difference in gametes.

Bhargava et al. note that the terms sex and gender are not, and should not be used as, interchangeable terms. They state that "[s]ex is dichotomous, with sex determination in the fertilized zygote stemming from unequal expression of sex chromosomal genes." In contrast, gender is seen as including "perception of the individual as male, female, or other, both by the individual and by society". The authors differentiate between sex differences, caused by biological factors, and gender differences, which "reflect a complex interplay of psychological, environmental, cultural, and biological factors". Gender identity is thus seen as a "psychological concept that refers to an individual's self-perception".

==== Sex differences ====
The term sex differences is typically applied to sexually dimorphic traits that are hypothesized to be evolved consequences of sexual selection. For example, the human "sex difference" in height is a consequence of sexual selection, while the "gender difference" typically seen in head hair length (women with longer hair) is not. Scientific research shows an individual's sex influences their behavior.

Sex differences are primarily caused by hormonal, genetic, and environmental factors. According to David Geary, the most fundamental sex difference in humans is the respective cost of reproduction, which is higher for females than males because of pregnancy and higher postnatal parental expenditure, resulting in different mating choice preferences for males and females.

=== In psychiatry ===
The American Psychiatric Association states that "Sex is often described as a biological construct defined on an anatomical, hormonal, or genetic basis."

Robert Stoller, whose work was the first to treat sex and gender as "two different orders of data", in his book Sex and Gender: The Development of Masculinity and Femininity, uses the term 'sex' to refer to the "male or the female sex and the component biological parts that determine whether one is a male or a female". He further states that, in order to determine sex, chromosomes, external genitalia, internal genitalia, gonads, hormonal states, secondary sex characteristics, and possibly also brain systems, must be analysed. He states that a person's sex is determined by "an algebraic sum of all these qualities", resulting in most people being classified as either 'male' or 'female'.

=== In psychology ===
One of the (context dependant) guidelines used by the American Psychological Association states that "[t]here are a number of indicators of biological sex, including sex chromosomes, gonads, internal reproductive organs, and external genitalia."

In The Psychology of Gender, it is stated that "sex refers to the biological categories of female and male, categories distinguished by genes, chromosomes, and hormones."

=== In sociology ===
Sociologist Dudley Poston states that sex in humans is "determined biologically, in five ways":

- Based on different chromosomes.
- Based on different gonads, which produce the gametes and sex hormones.
- Based on different relative levels of sex-specific hormones.
- Based on different internal reproductive structures.
- Based on different sex-specific external genitals. This definition usually results in the assignment of sex at birth.

According to Poston, "[s]ex refers mainly to biological characteristics, while gender refers mainly to sociological characteristics."

While noting that typically sex is assigned based on genital inspection at birth, Raine Dozier states that biological sex is "a complex constellation of chromosomes, hormones, genitalia, and reproductive organs."

Used primarily in sociology and gender studies, doing gender is the socially constructed performance which takes place during routine human interactions, rather than as a set of essentialized qualities based on one's biological sex. The term first appeared in Candace West and Don Zimmerman's article "Doing Gender", published in the peer-reviewed journal, Gender and Society. Originally written in 1977 but not published until 1987, "Doing Gender" is the most cited article published in Gender and Society.

West and Zimmerman state that to understand gender as activity, it is important to differentiate between sex, sex category, and gender. They say that sex refers to the socially agreed upon specifications that establish one as male or female; sex is most often based on an individual's genitalia, or even their chromosomal typing before birth. They consider sex categories to be dichotomous, and that the person is placed in a sex category by exhibiting qualities exclusive to one category or the other. During most interactions, others situate a person's sex by identifying their sex category; however, they believe that a person's sex need not align with their sex category. West and Zimmerman maintain that the sex category is "established and sustained by the socially required identificatory displays that proclaim one's membership in one or the other category". Gender is the performance of attitudes and actions that are considered socially acceptable for one's sex category.

West and Zimmerman suggested that the interactional process of doing gender, combined with socially agreed upon gender expectations, holds individuals accountable for their gender performances. They also believe that while "doing gender" appropriately strengthens and promotes social structures based on the gender dichotomy, it inappropriately does not call into question these same social structures; only the individual actor is questioned. The concept of "doing gender" recognizes that gender both structures human interactions and is created through them.

==== Transgender and genderqueer ====
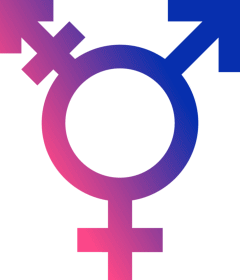
The gender symbol representing transgender

Transgender people experience a mismatch between their gender identity or gender expression, and their sex assigned at birth. Transgender people are sometimes called transsexual if they desire gender-affirming care to transition from one sex to another.

Transgender is also an umbrella term: in addition to including people whose gender identity is the opposite of their assigned sex (trans men and trans women), it may include people who are not exclusively masculine or feminine (e.g. people who are genderqueer, non-binary, bigender, pangender, genderfluid, or agender). Other definitions of transgender also include people who belong to a third gender, or conceptualize transgender people as a third gender. Infrequently, the term transgender is defined very broadly to include cross-dressers.

=== In archaeology ===
There is little general agreement among archaeologists about what can be accurately stated about gender identities, roles, and processes in the earliest human societies between 40,000 and 4,000 years before the present. There is a consensus that cultures at this time differentiated categories of people by 'gender', if this is defined as rules of behavior and roles based on sex. It is likely that the highly differentiated cultures of this period did not possess a single gender classification system, and instead their conception of gender may have been culture-specific, much like contemporary societies. It is feasible that some of the cultures of this era recognised up to five genders. For example, certain production roles, spiritual leaders, and healers may have been recognised as distinct genders. Whether or not social roles, such as religious leadership, were based upon gender, rather than age or skills, continues to be debated.

Some archaeological evidence suggests that gender, in the sense of social and behavioral distinctions, arose "at least by some 30,000 years ago". More evidence was found as of "26,000 years ago", at least at the archeological site Dolní Věstonice I and others, in what is now the Czech Republic. This is during the Upper Paleolithic time period. From the Mesolithic, various evidence suggests gender-differentiated tool use and diet in some cultures. By this time, it is likely that gender had become an important element of the organizational structure of these societies. Similar grave goods found in male and female high-status burials of this period, however, indicate that status was not simply based on gender. There is also much more evidence for the recognition of third and fourth genders from this period.

In 2011, it was reported that an untypical Corded Ware burial, dated to between 2900 and 2500 B.C., had been discovered in Prague. The remains, believed to be anatomically male, were orientated in the same way as women's burials and were not accompanied by any gender-specific grave goods. Based on this the archaeologist Kamila Věšínová suggests that it was likely that this was an individual "with a different sexual orientation, homosexual or transsexual", while media reports heralded the discovery of the world's first "gay caveman". Archaeologists and biological anthropologists criticised media coverage as sensationalist, as well as criticising Věšínová's original statement, in which she conflates sex, gender, and sexuality, arguing that, although the burial might well represent a transgender individual, it does not necessarily mean that they had a different sexual orientation, or that their culture would have considered them 'homosexual'. Jan Turek notes that there are several examples of Corded Ware graves containing older biological males with typically female grave goods and body orientation. He suggests that "aged men may have decided to 'retire' as women for symbolic and practical reasons."

=== In linguistics ===
The term gender is sometimes used by linguists to refer to social gender as well as grammatical gender. Some languages, such as German or Finnish, have no separate words for sex and gender. German, for example, uses "Biologisches Geschlecht" for biological sex, and "Soziales Geschlecht" for gender when making this distinction. Traditionally, however, a distinction has been made by linguists between sex and gender, where sex refers primarily to the attributes of real-world entities – the relevant extralinguistic attributes being, for instance, male, female, non-personal, and indeterminate sex – and grammatical gender refers to a category, such as masculine, feminine, and neuter (frequently based on sex, but not exclusively so in all languages), that determines the agreement between nouns of different genders and associated words, such as articles and adjectives.

A Comprehensive Grammar of the English Language, for instance, states

By GENDER is meant a grammatical classification of nouns, pronouns, or other words in the noun phrase according to certain meaning-related distinctions, especially a distinction related to the sex of the referent.

Thus German, for instance, has three genders: masculine, feminine, and neuter. Nouns referring to people and animals of known sex are generally referred to by nouns with the equivalent gender. Thus Mann (meaning man) is masculine and is associated with a masculine definite article to give der Mann, while Frau (meaning woman) is feminine and is associated with a feminine definite article to give die Frau. However the words for inanimate objects are commonly masculine (e.g. der Tisch, the table) or feminine (die Armbanduhr, the watch), and grammatical gender can diverge from biological sex; for instance the feminine noun [die] Person refers to a person of either sex, and the neuter noun [das] Mädchen means "the girl".

In modern English, there is no true grammatical gender in this sense, though the differentiation, for instance, between the pronouns "he" and "she", which in English refers to a difference in sex (or social gender), is sometimes referred to as a gender distinction. A Comprehensive Grammar of the English Language, for instance, refers to the semantically based "covert" gender (e.g. male and female, not masculine and feminine) of English nouns, as opposed to the "overt" gender of some English pronouns; this yields nine gender classes: male, female, dual, common, collective, higher male animal, higher female animal, lower animal, and inanimate, and these semantic gender classes affect the possible choices of pronoun for coreference to the real-life entity, e.g. who and he for brother but which and it or she for cow.

== Institutional and governmental use ==
=== United States government ===
==== Federal definition of sex and gender ====
On January 20, 2025, President Donald Trump signed Executive Order 14168 regarding the U.S. official definitions of sex and gender identity. The Executive Order defines sex as strictly biological and unchangeable. Gender identity is framed as a "subjective sense of self" that should not be considered a replacement for sex.

==== United States Census ====
The United States Census Bureau performs a census of the U.S. population every ten years. The questionnaire asks one question about sex, phrased as "What is person 1's sex?" and provides two checkboxes for the response, labeled "Male" and "Female". An explanatory page explains this question, using the term sex: as "We ask one question about a person's sex to better understand demographic characteristics." The U.S. Census has had a question about sex on the census since the 1790 census. The U.S. Census recognizes the difference between the terms sex and gender, the fact they are often confused or used interchangeably, and may differ across cultures and time, and explains that what the census attempts to measure, is "the sex composition of the population".

=== Australian government ===
The Australian government provides guidelines on sex and gender to the public based on legislation passed in 2013. The guidelines recognize that "individuals may identify as a gender other than the sex they were assigned at birth, or may not identify as exclusively male or female". The Australian Bureau of Statistics (ABS) gathers data about the population broken down in various ways, including by sex and gender. They require precise formulations of these terms, and go into some detail about sex recorded at birth, possible changes in sex assignment later in life, the meaning of gender and how it differs from sex. ABS recognizes the popular confusion among the two terms, and provide descriptions of how to phrase surveys so as to elicit accurate responses for the purposes of the data they collect.

The government of the state of Western Australia recognizes a clear distinction between sex and gender providing a nuanced definition of each, including complications involved in sex beyond just sex assigned at birth, and the socially constructed nature of gender, including possible non-binary aspects.

=== United Kingdom government ===
The United Kingdom Office for National Statistics (ONS) describes definitions provided by the UK government that make clear distinctions between the "biological aspects" of sex, "generally male or female", and "assigned at birth", while describing gender as a "social construction relating to behaviours and attributes based on labels of masculinity and femininity". Pilot plans for the 2021 Census for England and Wales would have allowed respondents to answer the sex question with reference to their gender identity, despite the addition of a separate new question on gender identity. Quantitative social scientists criticised the ONS's apparent confusion between the concepts of sex and gender identity. The matter was taken to Judicial Review by feminist group Fair Play for Women. The ONS argued that sex was an "umbrella concept", but this view was rejected by the presiding judge as unpersuasive. The guidance was changed so that sex was clearly indicated as legal sex rather than identity.

=== Health organizations ===
The World Health Organization's defines gender as "socially constructed", and sex as characteristics that are "biologically determined", drawing a distinction between the sex categories of male and female, and the genders "girls and boys who grow into men and women". Fenway Health define gender as: "The characteristics and roles of women and men according to social norms. While sex is described as female, male, and intersex, gender can be described as feminine, masculine, androgynous, and much more." According to the Centers for Disease Control and Prevention (CDC), people whose internal psychological experience differs from their assigned sex are transgender, transsexual, or non-binary.

The Food and Drug Administration (FDA) used to use gender instead of sex when referring to physiological differences between male and female organisms. In 2011, they reversed their position on this and began using sex as the biological classification and gender as "a person's self representation as male or female, or how that person is responded to by social institutions based on the individual's gender presentation". Gender is also now commonly used even to refer to the physiology of non-human animals, without any implication of social gender roles.

The American Psychiatric Association (APA) in their Guide for Working With Transgender and Gender Nonconforming Patients (TGNC Guide) has guidance for psychiatrists about gender, sex, and orientation. The TGNC defines gender as comprising two components: gender identity and gender expression. They define sex in biological terms, as "anatomical, hormonal, or genetic", and mentions birth assignment of sex based on external genital appearance.

The American Psychological Association defines gender as "socially constructed", and sex as "usually refers to the characteristics and traits of biological sex". The British National Health Service defines gender as "the social idea or identity as opposed to biological sex" and "can be fixed or fluid", and sex as "biological, based on genes, and how our external and internal sex and reproductive organs work and respond to hormones." The American Medical Association states that "Sex and gender are similar concepts. Both are socially constructed". The National Institutes of Health defines gender as "socially constructed", and sex as "usually refers to a person's biological characteristics". The American Medical Women's Association defines gender as "socially constructed", and sex as "biological differences between females and males, including chromosomes, sex organs, and endogenous hormonal profiles". The Canadian Institutes of Health Research defines gender as "socially constructed", and sex as "biological attributes". The American Counseling Association defines gender as "distinct from biological sex" and "can be fluid and self-defined".

=== Non-governmental organizations ===
GLAAD (formerly the Gay & Lesbian Alliance Against Defamation) makes a distinction between sex and gender. In their Media Reference Guide for transgender issues, they describe sex as "the classification of people as male or female" at birth, based on "external anatomy" and other bodily characteristics such as chromosomes, hormones, internal reproductive organs, and genitalia. GLAAD notes that "sex is not solely determined by anatomy, nor is it strictly binary". They define gender identity as "a person's internal, deeply held knowledge of their gender".

== Feminist theory ==
Antecedents to the feminist use of gender include the work of anthropologist Margaret Mead, who demonstrated that masculine and feminine roles are culturally variable rather than biologically determined, and philosopher Simone de Beauvoir, who famously stated, "One is not born but becomes a woman," arguing that women are socially constructed as the Other of men.

Ann Oakley's book Sex, Gender and Society (1972) was pivotal in transforming Money and Stoller's concept of gender into a critical analytical tool. "The constancy of sex must be admitted," said Oakley, "but so must also the variability of gender." Also in the 1970s, Gayle Rubin' introduced the expression sex/gender system as "the set of arrangements by which a society transforms biological sexuality into products of human activity". Since then, the distinction has been used by feminists to challenge the idea that inequalities between men and women are natural.

However, feminists who maintain that sex is also constructed are critical of it. French materialist feminists such as Christine Delphy, Colette Guillaumin and Monique Wittig have argued that naturalizing sex neglects its social character. Building off Wittig, Judith Butler writes:

If the immutable character of sex is contested, perhaps this construct called "sex" is as culturally constructed as gender; indeed, perhaps it was always already gender, with the consequence that the distinction between sex and gender turns out to be no distinction at all.

Additionally, many Beauvoir scholars believe that the received Anglo-American reading of The Second Sex is mistaken. Sara Heinämaa writes:

In Beauvoir's phenomenological perspective, "sex" (female/male) cannot be conceived as a natural basis for "gender" construction, and "gender" should not be viewed as the cultural interpretation of a pregiven "sex." Both sex and gender must be seen as theoretical abstractions or idealizations, developed in specific practices of explaining and predicting human behavior and based on the feminine and masculine styles of lived experience.

Mari Mikkola has put forward the "Trait/Norm Covariance Model", divided into descriptive traits and evaluative norms, as a suggested replacement. In this model, the term "descriptive traits" includes physical and anatomical traits, roles, and self-conceptions. So for example, "sex traits" (such as having ovaries) and "gender traits" (such as wearing make-up) are both subsumed under the category of descriptive traits, whereas "being feminine" is taken as an evaluative norm. Evaluative norms reflect how descriptive traits are evaluated by external observers, and certain descriptive traits may correlate with certain evaluative norms. So for example the trait "having long hair" covaries strongly with feminine norms in some cultures, and less so in others.

== Limitations ==
=== Inseparability of biological and cultural factors ===
Some psychologists have argued that the distinction between the terms "sex" and "gender" should be abandoned. The term "gender/sex" has been proposed, to emphasise the inseparability of biological and cultural factors.

Diane Halpern, in her book Sex Differences in Cognitive Abilities, argued problems with sex vs. gender terminology:

I cannot argue (in this book) that nature and nurture are inseparable and then... use different terms to refer to each class of variables. The... biological manifestations of sex are confounded with psychosocial variables.... The use of different terms to label these two types of contributions to human existence seemed inappropriate in light of the biopsychosocial position I have taken.

She quotes Steven Pinker's summary of the problems with the terms sex and gender: "Part of it is a new prissiness—many people today are as squeamish about sexual dimorphism as the Victorians were about sex. But part of it is a limitation of the English language. The word 'sex' refers ambiguously to copulation and to sexual dimorphism...". Richard Lippa writes in Gender, Nature and Nurture that:

Some researchers have argued that the word sex should be used to refer to (biological differences), whereas the word gender should be used to refer to (cultural differences). However, it is not at all clear the degree to which the differences between males and females are due to biological factors versus learned and cultural factors. Furthermore, indiscriminate use of the word gender tends to obscure the distinction between two different topics: (a) differences between males and females, and (b) individual differences in maleness and femaleness that occur within each sex.

It has been suggested that more useful distinctions to make would be whether a behavioral difference between the sexes is first due to an evolved adaptation, then, if so, whether the adaptation is sexually dimorphic (different) or sexually monomorphic (the same in both sexes). The term sex difference could then be redefined as between-sex differences that are manifestations of a sexually dimorphic adaptation (which is how many scientists use the term), while the term gender difference could be redefined as due to differential socialization between the sexes of a monomorphic adaptation or byproduct. For example, greater male propensity toward physical aggression and risk taking would be termed a "sex difference;" the generally longer head hair length of females would be termed a "gender difference".

=== Social construction of sex ===
Some feminist theorists have criticised the biological basis of sexual dimorphism. These theorists claim to have demonstrated that there are more than two naturally occurring sexes, that none of the typical indicators of biological sex—chromosomes, hormones, gonads, internal morphology, external genitalia, or secondary sex characteristics—fit neatly into a binary system, and that these indicators do not consistently distinguish all men from all women nor establish a shared foundation within each sex.

Andrea Dworkin wrote: "We are, clearly, a multisexed species which has its sexuality spread along a vast continuum where the elements called male and female are not discrete." This inspired John Stoltenberg's 1989 essay "How Men Have (a) Sex", in which he argues that sex is a social construct. Sociologist Judith Lorber also states that many conventional indicators of sex are not sufficient to demarcate male from female, and that there is more diversity within the individual categories of sex and gender—female/male and feminine/masculine, respectively—than between them. Hence, their fundamental claim is that neither sex nor gender are natural kinds.

Feminist scholarship argues that sex is socially constructed in two ways: conceptually (our definitions of sex are shaped by cultural and historical contexts) and materially (social environments shape bodily development). This challenges both the sex/gender distinction and the nature/culture binary. In the field of feminist philosophy, sexual difference is discussed by Elizabeth Grosz, Gayatri Spivak, Hélène Cixous, Jane Gallop, Judith Butler, Luce Irigaray, Moira Gatens, Monique Wittig, Naomi Schor, and Vicki Kirby, among others.

==== Research on intersexuality ====
Feminist critiques of the medical management of intersex infants—particularly John Money's "Optimal Gender of Rearing" model—expose how binary sex categories are socially imposed through norms. Scholars like Anne Fausto-Sterling, Suzanne Kessler, and Judith Butler highlighted how heteronormative and gendered ideals guided medical decisions.

Kessler, in a 1990 survey of medical specialists in pediatric intersexuality, found out that when a child was born with XY chromosomes but ambiguous genitalia, their sex was often determined according to the size of their penis. Thus, even if the sex/gender distinction holds, the dichotomies of female/male and masculine/feminine are not themselves exhaustive.

Fausto-Sterling's Sexing the Body famously addresses the birth of intersex children. In their case, the standard model (sex/gender distinction) is seen as incorrect with regard to its notion that there are only two sexes, male and female. This is because "complete maleness and complete femaleness represent the extreme ends of a spectrum of possible body types." In other words, Fausto-Sterling argues that sex is a continuum, and that nature does not decide who is socially considered male or female; instead, it is doctors who establish what appears to be the "natural" sex for the inhabitants of society.

Legal scholarship has examined how sex classification in cases of intersex variation has been determined through institutional practices. Maayan Sudai shows that, in earlier legal contexts, sex was determined through evidentiary processes that incorporated physical, social, and behavioral factors, and that the later rise of medical authority shifted the determination of sex from courts to clinical settings, where it was increasingly treated as a matter for medical expertise.

==== Historiography ====
Historian Thomas W. Laqueur suggests that from the Renaissance to the 18th century, there was a prevailing inclination among doctors towards the existence of only one biological sex (the one-sex theory, that women and men had the same fundamental reproductive structure). In some discourses, this view persisted into the eighteenth and nineteenth centuries. Laqueur asserts that even at its peak, the one-sex model was supported among highly educated Europeans but is not known to have been a popular view nor one entirely agreed upon by doctors who treated the general population.

Scholars such as Joan Cadden and Michael Stolberg have criticized Laqueur's theory. Stolberg provides evidence to suggest that significant two-sex understandings of anatomy existed before Laqueur claims, arguing that sexual dimorphism was accepted as early as the sixteenth century. Joan Cadden has stated that 'one-sex' models of the body were already treated with scepticism in the ancient and medieval periods, and that Laqueur's periodisation of the shift from one-sex to two-sex was not as clear-cut as he made it out to be.

In Histories of the Transgender Child (2018), historian Jules Gill-Peterson presents an extensive critique of Money and Stoller's gender theory and its acceptance by feminism in the 1970s. She situates the development of the sex/gender distinction within the context of the medicalization of intersexuality.

== See also ==
- Anti-gender movement
- Feminist metaphysics
- Feminist views on transgender topics
- Gender equality
- Gender polarization
- Sex differences in humans
- Sex differences in psychology
- Stereotyping
