= Gender (disambiguation) =

Gender is the range of characteristics pertaining to, and differentiating between, masculinity and femininity.

Gender or Genders may also refer to:

== Linguistics ==
- Grammatical gender, in linguistics, a system of noun classes
- Voice (grammar), in linguistics, a system of verb classes

== Science and technology ==
- Gender, used as a synonym or polite euphemism for biological sex
- Gender of connectors and fasteners, the designation of male or female connectors in electrical and mechanical trades

== Music ==
- Gendèr, an Indonesian musical instrument used in gamelan orchestras
- Gender of tonalities, in music, the designation of major and minor keys as masculine or feminine
- "Gender", a song from the album Candyass by Orgy
- "Gender", a song from the album Black Labyrinth by Jonathan Davis

== Other uses ==
- Gender (stream), a stream in North Brabant, the Netherlands
- Genders (surname) (including a list of people with the name)

== See also ==
- Language and gender
- Gender-neutral language
- Gender paradox
- Gender studies
- Genre
