= One-sex and two-sex theories =

Historiographical thesis about Western concepts of sex difference

- Originating work: Making Sex: Body and Gender from the Greeks to Freud (1990)
- Author: Thomas Laqueur
- Discipline: History of medicine, history of sexuality, gender studies
- Key critics: Helen King, Joan Cadden, Katharine Park, Michael Stolberg, Monica H. Green

The one-sex and two-sex theories (also referred to as the one-sex and two-sex models) are historiographical concepts introduced by historian Thomas Laqueur in his 1990 book Making Sex: Body and Gender from the Greeks to Freud. Laqueur proposed that Western medical and philosophical thought underwent a fundamental shift in the 18th century: from a "one-sex model," in which female anatomy was understood as an inverted, inferior version of male anatomy, to a "two-sex model" treating men and women as anatomically distinct and opposite.

While Making Sex has been highly influential in gender studies, literary criticism, and cultural history, its thesis has attracted substantial criticism from historians of medicine and science. Critics including Helen King, Joan Cadden, Katharine Park, and Michael Stolberg have argued that Laqueur oversimplifies the historical record, misreads primary sources, and imposes an artificial chronological divide where one-sex and two-sex understandings in fact coexisted throughout Western history. The historian Monica H. Green has called on scholars to move beyond the framework entirely.The scholar Paola Uparela has demonstrated that this model does not apply in the Iberian and Colonial American contexts.

== Laqueur's thesis ==
=== The one-sex model ===
According to Laqueur, Western medicine from antiquity through the early modern period operated under a "one-sex model" in which women were understood as imperfect or inverted versions of men rather than as a fundamentally different sex. In this framework, anatomists purportedly viewed female genitalia as a homologous but inferior version of male anatomy: the vagina as an internal penis, the uterus as scrotum, and the ovaries as testicles.

Laqueur draws primarily on Galen, the 2nd-century Greek physician, who asked readers to imagine male genitalia "turned in and extending inward between the rectum and the bladder." Laqueur interprets such passages as evidence that ancient and medieval physicians literally believed female and male reproductive organs to be structurally identical, differing only in placement due to women's supposed lack of bodily heat. However, critics have challenged this interpretation, arguing that Galen and other writers were drawing analogies to aid understanding rather than asserting literal identity (see § Misreading of sources).

Laqueur also argues that under the one-sex model, bodily fluids were considered interconvertible between the sexes, and that female orgasm was considered necessary for conception—a view he claims declined with the shift to the two-sex model.

=== The two-sex model ===
Laqueur argues that around the 18th century, European thought shifted to a "two-sex model" in which male and female bodies were reconceptualized as fundamentally different and opposite rather than as variations on a single type. In this new framework, anatomical differences between the sexes became the biological foundation for gender roles, rather than gender roles being primary and anatomy secondary.

Laqueur attributes this shift primarily to political rather than scientific factors, particularly the upheavals surrounding the French Revolution and emerging debates about women's place in public life. He argues that the new emphasis on biological difference served to justify women's exclusion from the public sphere by grounding gender hierarchy in nature rather than custom. Stolberg and other critics have contested this political explanation, pointing to multiple contributing factors including the rise of empirical observation in the 16th and 17th centuries and the decline of humorism.

== Scholarly criticism ==
Laqueur's thesis has been subject to extensive criticism from historians of medicine and science. Critics have challenged his reading of primary sources, the accuracy of his chronology, and the usefulness of the one-sex/two-sex binary as a historiographical framework.

=== Coexistence of multiple models ===
Multiple scholars have argued that one-sex and two-sex understandings of the body coexisted throughout Western history, rather than succeeding one another in distinct eras. Helen King's The One-Sex Body on Trial (2013) provides a detailed critique, arguing that both ways of thinking about the body have existed alongside one another since antiquity, and that authors chose which model to foreground depending on their rhetorical purposes.

Joan Cadden's Meanings of Sex Difference in the Middle Ages (1993) demonstrates that medieval medical writers held diverse and often contradictory views about sex difference that cannot be reduced to a single "one-sex" framework. Medieval texts emphasized differences between the sexes in ways Laqueur's model does not accommodate, including differences in bodily flesh, humoral composition, and the uniquely female functions of menstruation and lactation.

=== Earlier emergence of sexual dimorphism ===
Michael Stolberg's 2003 article "A Woman Down to Her Bones" challenges Laqueur's chronology directly, providing evidence that explicit sexual dimorphism in anatomical thinking emerged by the early 17th century—at least 200 years before Laqueur claims. Stolberg demonstrates that leading physicians around 1600 insisted on the distinctive features of the female skeleton and female genital organs, and illustrated them visually, contradicting the notion of a dominant one-sex model persisting until the Enlightenment.

Stolberg also contests Laqueur's claim that sexual dimorphism arose primarily as a political response to Enlightenment ideals of equality, citing multiple contributing factors including renewed emphasis on empirical observation during the 16th and 17th centuries and the declining influence of humorism.

=== Misreading of sources ===
Katharine Park and Robert Nye's early review of Making Sex argued that Laqueur misinterprets ancient and Renaissance anatomists' comparisons between male and female genitalia. When Galen and other writers compared the vagina to a penis or the uterus to a scrotum, they were drawing analogies to aid understanding, not asserting literal identity. Park and Nye suggest that reading such passages as claims of structural sameness is anachronistic.

King further demonstrates that Laqueur selectively quoted and decontextualized his sources. For example, his interpretation of anatomical illustrations by Andreas Vesalius as evidence for the one-sex model ignores the illustrations' accompanying captions and labels, which identify specifically female structures. King also notes that Laqueur relied heavily on Galen's On the Usefulness of the Parts of the Body while ignoring Hippocratic texts that emphasized fundamental differences between male and female flesh and physiology.

=== Calls to move beyond the framework ===
Critics have noted that Making Sex achieved widespread influence partly because its binary framework offered a conveniently simple narrative for scholars across disciplines. As historiographical surveys have observed, the neatness of Laqueur's story—one era, one model, replaced by another era, another model—made it highly exportable, even as specialists in the history of medicine increasingly found it inadequate.

Monica H. Green's 2018 article in Eugesta titled "Let Go of Laqueur" called for scholars to move beyond the one-sex/two-sex framework entirely and develop more nuanced histories of how bodies have been understood as sexed across different times and cultures.

=== Laqueur's response ===
In a 2003 response to Stolberg, Laqueur argued that isolated pieces of evidence for sexual dimorphism in Renaissance anatomy do not undermine his thesis, since individual observations do not discredit prevailing worldviews. He maintained that the fundamental epistemological shift he described—from sex as reflecting metaphysical truths to sex as biological foundation for gender—remained valid regardless of when specific anatomical differences were first noted.

== Influence and legacy ==
Despite the scholarly criticisms described above, Making Sex has remained widely cited, particularly in gender studies, literary criticism, and cultural history. The book helped establish the broader argument that sex, like gender, has a history shaped by cultural and political contexts rather than being a timeless biological given. This broader insight has proven productive for scholars even when they reject Laqueur's specific historical claims.

The ongoing debate over Making Sex also illustrates broader methodological questions in the history of science: how to interpret historical texts without imposing modern categories, how to balance sweeping narratives against the complexity of historical evidence, and how disciplinary popularity can sustain a thesis despite sustained criticism from specialists.

== See also ==
- History of biology
- History of medicine
- History of sexuality
- Sex and gender distinction
- Social construction of gender
- Thomas Laqueur
