= Gender =

Sociological constructs related to sex

Gender is the range of social, psychological, cultural, and behavioral aspects of being a man (or boy), woman (or girl), or portraying a third gender. Although gender often corresponds to sex, a transgender person may identify with a gender other than their sex assigned at birth. Most cultures have a gender binary, in which gender is divided into two categories, and people are considered part of one or the other; those who are outside these groups may fall under the umbrella term non-binary. Some societies have third genders (and fourth genders, etc.) such as the hijras of South Asia and two-spirit persons native to North America. Most scholars agree that gender is a central characteristic for social organization; this may include social constructs (i.e. gender roles) as well as gender expression.

The word has been used as a synonym for sex, and the balance between these usages has shifted over time. In the mid-20th century, a terminological distinction in modern English (known as the sex and gender distinction) between biological sex and gender began to develop in the academic areas of psychology, sociology, sexology, and feminism. Before the mid-20th century, it was uncommon to use the word gender to refer to anything but grammatical categories. In the West, in the 1970s, feminist theory embraced the concept of a distinction between biological sex and the social construct of gender. The distinction between gender and sex is made by most contemporary social scientists in Western countries, behavioral scientists and biologists, many legal systems and government bodies, and intergovernmental agencies such as the WHO. The experiences of intersex people also testify to the complexity of sex and gender; female, male, and other gender identities are experienced across the many divergences of sexual difference.

The social sciences have a branch devoted to gender studies. Other sciences, such as psychology, sociology, sexology, and neuroscience, are interested in the subject. The social sciences sometimes approach gender as a social construct, and gender studies particularly does, while research in the natural sciences investigates whether biological differences in females and males influence the development of gender in humans; both inform the debate about how far biological differences influence the formation of gender identity and gendered behavior. Biopsychosocial approaches to gender include biological, psychological, and social/cultural aspects.

== Etymology and usage ==
=== Derivation ===
The modern English word gender comes from the Middle English gender, gendre, a loanword from Anglo-Norman and Middle French gendre. This, in turn, came from Latin genus. Both words mean "kind", "type", or "sort". They derive ultimately from a Proto-Indo-European (PIE) root *ǵénh₁- 'to beget', which is also the source of kin, kind, king, and many other English words, with cognates widely attested in many Indo-European languages. It appears in Modern French in the word genre (type, kind, also genre sexuel) and is related to the Greek root gen- (to produce), appearing in gene, genesis, and oxygen. The Oxford Etymological Dictionary of the English Language of 1882 defined gender as kind, breed, sex, derived from the Latin ablative case of genus, like genere natus, which refers to birth. The first edition of the Oxford English Dictionary (OED1, Volume 4, 1900) notes the original meaning of gender as "kind" had already become obsolete.

=== History of the concept ===
The concept of gender, in the modern social science sense, is a recent invention in human history. The ancient world had no basis of understanding gender as it has been understood in the humanities and social sciences for the past few decades. The term gender had been associated with grammar for most of history and only started to move towards it being a malleable cultural construct in the 1950s and 1960s.

Before the terminological distinction between biological sex and gender as a role developed, it was uncommon to use the word gender to refer to anything but grammatical categories. For example, in a bibliography of 12,000 references on marriage and family from 1900 to 1964, the term gender does not even emerge once. Analysis of more than 30 million academic article titles from 1945 to 2001 showed that the uses of the term "gender", were much rarer than uses of "sex", was often used as a grammatical category early in this period. By the end of this period, uses of "gender" outnumbered uses of "sex" in the social sciences, arts, and humanities. It was in the 1970s that feminist scholars adopted the term gender as way of distinguishing "socially constructed" aspects of male–female differences (gender) from "biologically determined" aspects (sex).

As of 2024, many dictionaries list "synonym for 'sex'" as one of gender's meanings, alongside its sociocultural meaning. According to the Oxford English Dictionary, gender came into use as a synonym for sex during the twentieth century, initially as a euphemism, as sex was undergoing its own usage shift toward referring to sexual intercourse rather than male/female categories. During the last two decades of the 20th century, gender was often used as a synonym for sex in its non-copulatory senses, especially outside the social sciences. David Haig, writing in 2003, said "the sex/gender distinction is now only fitfully observed." Within the social sciences, however, use of gender in academia increased greatly, outnumbering uses of sex during that same period. In the natural sciences, gender was more often used as a synonym for sex. This can be attributed to the influence of feminism. Haig stated, "Among the reasons that working [natural] scientists have given me for choosing gender rather than sex in biological contexts are desires to signal sympathy with feminist goals, to use a more academic term, or to avoid the connotation of copulation." Haig also notes that "gender" became the preferred term when discussing phenomena for which the social versus biological cause was unknown, disputed, or actually an interaction between the two. In 1993, the US Food and Drug Administration (FDA) started to use gender instead of sex to avoid confusion with sexual intercourse. Later, in 2011, the FDA reversed its position and began using sex as the biological classification and gender as "a person's self-representation as male or female, or how that person is responded to by social institutions based on the individual's gender presentation."

In legal cases alleging discrimination, a 2006 law review article by Meredith Render notes "as notions of gender and sexuality have evolved over the last few decades, legal theories concerning what it means to discriminate "because of sex" under Title VII have experienced a similar evolution". In a 1999 law review article proposing a legal definition of sex that "emphasizes gender self-identification," Julie Greenberg writes, "Most legislation utilizes the word 'sex,' yet courts, legislators, and administrative agencies often substitute the word 'gender' for 'sex' when they interpret these statutes." In J.E.B. v. Alabama ex rel. T.B., a 1994 United States Supreme Court case addressing "whether the Equal Protection Clause forbids intentional discrimination on the basis of gender", the majority opinion noted that with regard to gender, "It is necessary only to acknowledge that 'our Nation has had a long and unfortunate history of sex discrimination,' id., at 684, 93 S.Ct., at 1769, a history which warrants the heightened scrutiny we afford all gender-based classifications today", and stated "When state actors exercise peremptory challenges in reliance on gender stereotypes, they ratify and reinforce prejudicial views of the relative abilities of men and women."

==== As a grammatical category ====
The word was still widely used, however, in the specific sense of grammatical gender (the assignment of nouns to categories such as masculine, feminine and neuter). According to Aristotle, this concept was introduced by the Greek philosopher Protagoras. In 1926, Henry Watson Fowler stated that the definition of the word pertained to this grammar-related meaning:

Gender...is a grammatical term only. To talk of persons...of the masculine or feminine g[ender], meaning of the male or female sex, is either a jocularity (permissible or not according to context) or a blunder.

==== As distinct from sex ====
In 1945, Madison Bentley defined gender as the "socialized obverse of sex". Controversial sexologist John Money coined the term gender role, and was the first to use it in print in a scientific journal in 1955. In the seminal 1955 paper, he defined it as "all those things that a person says or does to disclose himself or herself as having the status of boy or man, girl or woman." Psychiatrist Robert Stoller formalized the distinction in his 1968 book Sex and Gender.

The modern academic sense of the word, in the context of social roles of men and women, was popularized and further developed by the feminist movement from the 1970s onwards (see feminist theory and gender studies below), which theorizes that human nature is essentially epicene and social distinctions based on sex are arbitrarily constructed. In this context, matters pertaining to this theoretical process of social construction were labelled matters of gender.

The popular use of gender simply as an alternative to sex (as a biological category) is also widespread, although attempts are still made to preserve the distinction. The American Heritage Dictionary (2000) uses the following two sentences to illustrate the difference, noting that the distinction "is useful in principle, but it is by no means widely observed, and considerable variation in usage occurs at all levels."

The effectiveness of the medication appears to depend on the sex (not gender) of the patient.
In peasant societies, gender (not sex) roles are likely to be more clearly defined.

== Biological factors and views ==
Some gendered behavior is influenced by prenatal and early life androgen exposure. This includes, for example, gender normative play, self-identification with a gender, and tendency to engage in aggressive behavior. Males of most mammals, including humans, exhibit more rough and tumble play behavior, which is influenced by maternal testosterone levels. These levels may also influence sexuality, with non-heterosexual persons exhibiting sex atypical behavior in childhood.

Some research pertaining to the biological causes of gender incongruence has been done. Transgender and cisgender gender identity is influenced by genetic factors and it has been hypothesised that it may be influenced by the prenatal hormonal environment or sexual dimorphism in the brain.

There are studies concerning women who have a condition called congenital adrenal hyperplasia, which leads to the overproduction of the masculine sex hormone, androgen. These women usually have ordinary female appearances (though nearly all girls with congenital adrenal hyperplasia (CAH) have corrective surgery performed on their genitals). However, despite taking hormone-balancing medication given to them at birth, these females are statistically more likely to be interested in activities traditionally linked to males than female activities. Psychology professor and CAH researcher Dr. Sheri Berenbaum attributes these differences to an exposure of higher levels of male sex hormones in utero.

=== Non-human animals ===
In non-human animal research, gender is commonly used to refer to the biological sex of the animals. According to biologist Michael J. Ryan, gender identity is a concept exclusively applied to humans. Also, in a letter Ellen Ketterson writes, "[w]hen asked, my colleagues in the Department of Gender Studies agreed that the term gender could be properly applied only to humans, because it involves one's self-concept as man or woman. Sex is a biological concept; gender is a human social and cultural concept." However, Poiani (2010) notes that the question of whether behavioural similarities across species can be associated with gender identity or not is "an issue of no easy resolution", and suggests that mental states, such as gender identity, are more accessible in humans than other species due to their capacity for language. Poiani suggests that the potential number of species with members possessing a gender identity must be limited due to the requirement for self-consciousness.

Jacques Balthazart suggests that "there is no animal model for studying sexual identity. It is impossible to ask an animal, whatever its species, to what sex it belongs." He notes that "this would imply that the animal is aware of its own body and sex, which is far from proved", despite recent research demonstrating sophisticated cognitive skills among non-human primates and other species. Hird (2006) has also stated that whether or not non-human animals consider themselves to be feminine or masculine is a "difficult, if not impossible, question to answer", as this would require "judgements about what constitutes femininity or masculinity in any given species". Nonetheless, she asserts that "non-human animals do experience femininity and masculinity to the extent that any given species' behaviour is gender segregated."

Despite this, Poiani and Dixson emphasise the applicability of the concept of gender role to non-human animals such as rodents throughout their book. The concept of gender role has also been applied to non-human primates such as rhesus monkeys.

In 2023, an investigation by Neves et al. showed small but important details in communication, such as grammatical genders, in the construction of stereotypes and inherent emotions associated with four non-human animals (Giant panda; giraffe; polar bear; cheetah).

== Feminist theory ==
Biologist and feminist academic Anne Fausto-Sterling rejects the discourse of biological versus social determinism and advocates a deeper analysis of how interactions between the biological being and the social environment influence individuals' capacities.

Philosopher Simone de Beauvoir applied existentialism to women's experience of life: "One is not born a woman, one becomes one." In context, this is a phenomenology-oriented philosophical statement. However, it may be analyzed in terms of biology—a girl must pass puberty to become a woman—and sociology, as a great deal of mature relating in social contexts is learned rather than instinctive.

Within feminist theory, terminology for gender issues developed over the 1970s. Ann Oakley's book Sex, Gender and Society (1972) was pivotal in transforming the concept of gender into a critical analytical tool. By 1980, most feminist writings had agreed on using gender only for socioculturally adapted traits. Beauvoir has been interpreted as initiating this distinction in feminist theory, although this reading is contested by many scholars.

Andrea Dworkin stated her "commitment to destroying male dominance and gender itself" and affiliation with radical feminism, which envisions liberation as the dismantling of gender assignments so that people may live free from imposed categorisation.

Political scientist Mary Hawkesworth addresses gender and feminist theory, stating that since the 1970s the concept of gender has transformed and been used in significantly different ways within feminist scholarship. She notes that a transition occurred when several feminist scholars, such as Sandra Harding and Joan Scott, began to conceive of gender "as an analytic category within which humans think about and organize their social activity". Feminist scholars in Political Science began employing gender as an analytical category, which highlighted "social and political relations neglected by mainstream accounts". However, Hawkesworth states "feminist political science has not become a dominant paradigm within the discipline".

== Gender studies ==
Gender studies is a field of interdisciplinary study and academic field devoted to gender, gender identity and gendered representation as central categories of analysis. This field includes Women's studies (concerning women, femininity, their gender roles and politics, and feminism), Men's studies (concerning men, masculinity, their gender roles, and politics), and LGBTQ studies. Sometimes Gender studies is offered together with Study of Sexuality. These disciplines study gender and sexuality in the fields of literature and language, history, political science, sociology, anthropology, cinema and media studies, human development, law, and medicine. It also analyses race, ethnicity, location, nationality, and disability.

In gender studies, the term gender refers to proposed social and cultural constructions of masculinities and femininities. In this context, gender explicitly excludes reference to biological differences, to focus on cultural differences. This emerged from a number of different areas: in sociology during the 1950s; from the theories of the psychoanalyst Jacques Lacan; and in the work of French psychoanalysts like Julia Kristeva, Luce Irigaray, and American feminists such as Judith Butler. Those who followed Butler came to regard gender roles as a practice, sometimes referred to as "performative".

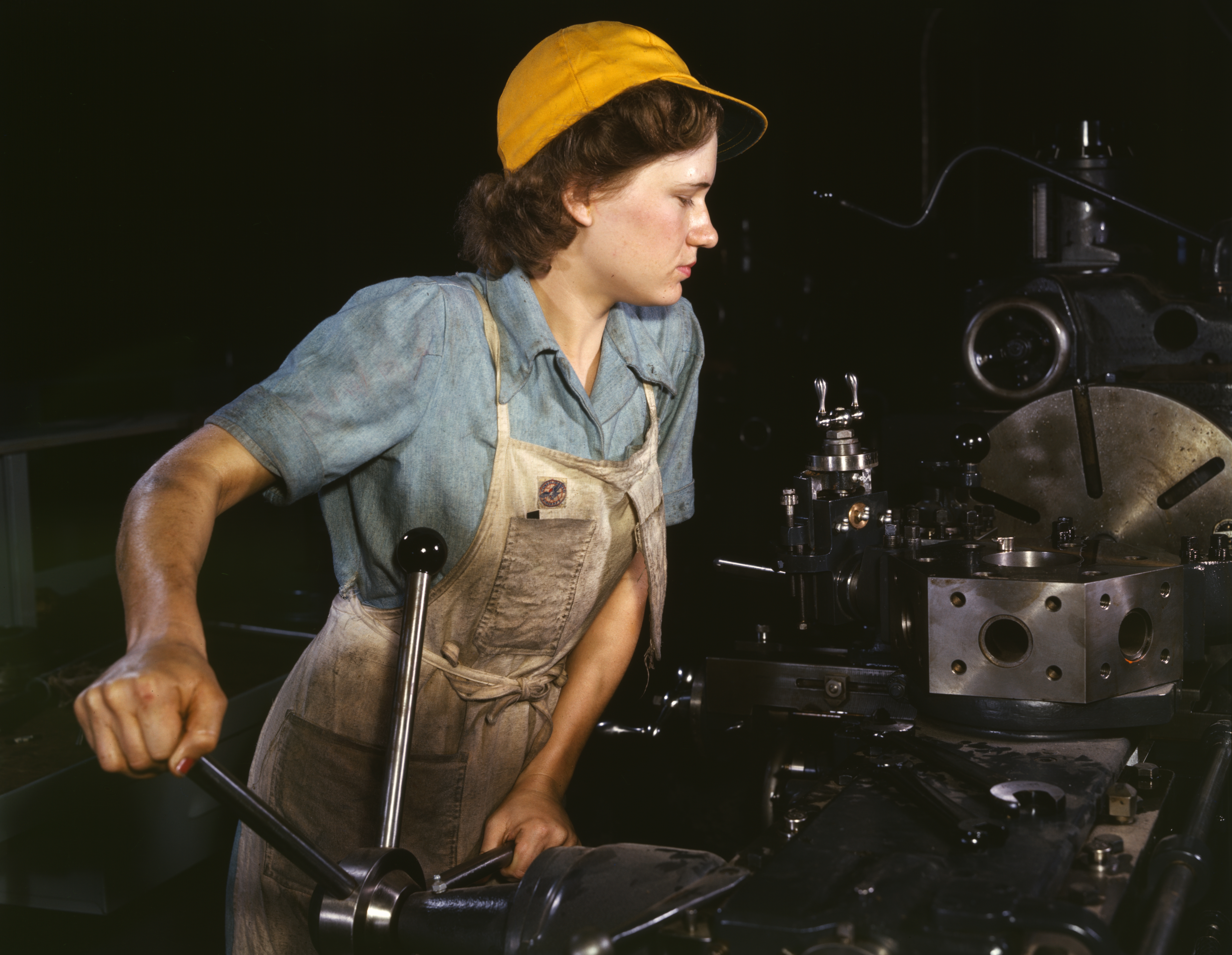
"Rosie the Riveter" was an iconic symbol of the American homefront in WWII and a departure from restrictive, "feminine", gender roles due to wartime necessity.

Charles E. Hurst states that some people think sex will, "...automatically determine one's gender demeanor and role (social) as well as one's sexual orientation" (sexual attractions and behavior). Gender sociologists believe that people have cultural origins and habits for dealing with gender. For example, Michael Schwalbe believes that humans must be taught how to act appropriately in their designated gender to fill the role properly, and that the way people behave as masculine or feminine interacts with social expectations. Schwalbe comments that humans "are the results of many people embracing and acting on similar ideas". People do this through everything from clothing and hairstyle to relationship and employment choices. Schwalbe believes that these distinctions are important, because society wants to identify and categorize people as soon as we see them. They need to place people into distinct categories to know how we should feel about them.

Hurst comments that in a society where we present our genders so distinctly, there can often be severe consequences for breaking these cultural norms. Many of these consequences are rooted in discrimination based on sexual orientation. Gays and lesbians are often discriminated against in our legal system because of societal prejudices. Hurst describes how this discrimination works against people for breaking gender norms, no matter what their sexual orientation is. He says that "courts often confuse sex, gender, and sexual orientation, and confuse them in a way that results in denying the rights not only of gays and lesbians, but also of those who do not present themselves or act in a manner traditionally expected of their sex". This prejudice plays out in our legal system when a person is judged differently because they do not present themselves as the "correct" gender.

American political scientist Karen Beckwith addresses the concept of gender within political science arguing that a "common language of gender" exists and that it must be explicitly articulated in order to build upon it within the political science discipline. Beckwith describes two ways in which the political scientist may employ 'gender' when conducting empirical research: "gender as a category and as a process." Employing gender as a category allows for political scientists "to delineate specific contexts where behaviours, actions, attitudes and preferences considered masculine or feminine result in particular political outcomes". It may also demonstrate how gender differences, not necessarily corresponding precisely with sex, may "constrain or facilitate political" actors. Gender as a process has two central manifestations in political science research, firstly in determining "the differential effects of structures and policies upon men and women," and secondly, the ways in which masculine and feminine political actors "actively work to produce favorable gendered outcomes".

With regard to gender studies, Jacquetta Newman states that although sex is determined biologically, the ways in which people express gender is not. Gendering is a socially constructed process based on culture, though often cultural expectations around women and men have a direct relationship to their biology. Because of this, Newman argues, many privilege sex as being a cause of oppression and ignore other issues like race, ability, poverty, etc. Current gender studies classes seek to move away from that and examine the intersectionality of these factors in determining people's lives. She also points out that other non-Western cultures do not necessarily have the same views of gender and gender roles. Newman also debates the meaning of equality, which is often considered the goal of feminism; she believes that equality is a problematic term because it can mean many different things, such as people being treated identically, differently, or fairly based on their gender. Newman believes this is problematic because there is no unified definition as to what equality means or looks like, and that this can be significantly important in areas like public policy.

=== Gender identity and gender roles ===
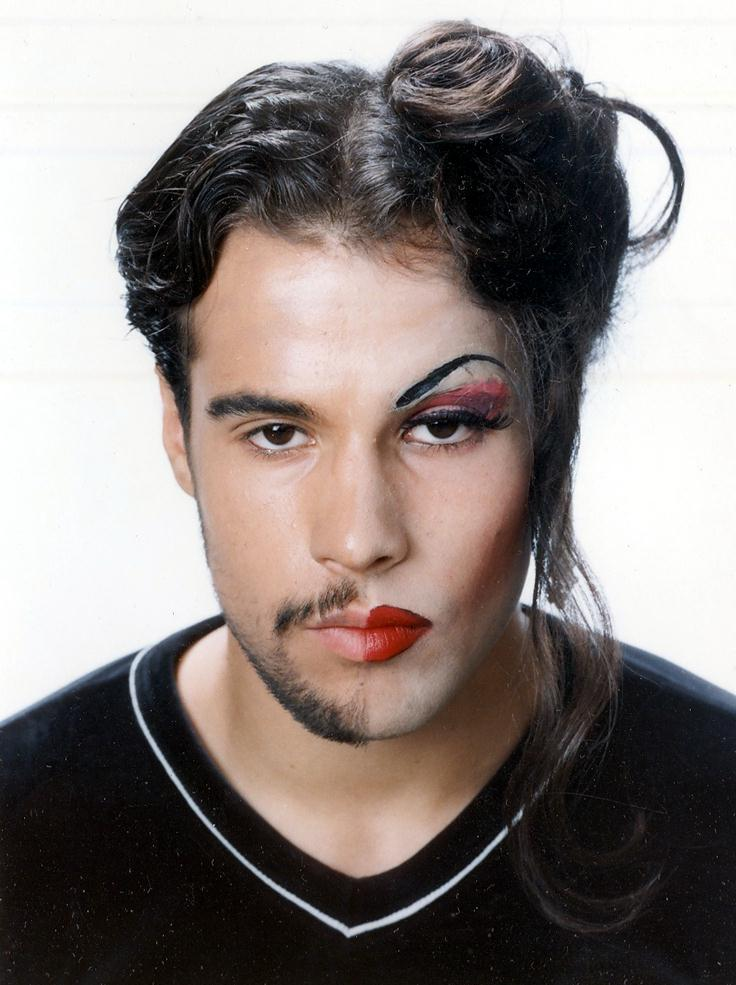
Gender depicted as an ambiguous phenomenon, by a young Swedish actor

Gender identity refers to a personal identification with a particular gender and gender role in society. The term woman has historically been used interchangeably with reference to the female body, though more recently this usage has been viewed as controversial by some feminists.

There are qualitative analyses that explore and present the representations of gender; however, feminists challenge these dominant ideologies concerning gender roles and biological sex. One's biological sex is oftentimes tied to specific social roles and expectations. Judith Butler considers the concept of being a woman to have more challenges, owing not only to society's viewing women as a social category but also as a felt sense of self, a culturally conditioned or constructed subjective identity. Social identity refers to the common identification with a collectivity or social category that creates a common culture among participants concerned. According to social identity theory, an important component of the self-concept is derived from memberships in social groups and categories; this is demonstrated by group processes and how inter-group relationships impact significantly on individuals' self perception and behaviors. The groups people belong to therefore provide members with the definition of who they are and how they should behave within their social sphere.

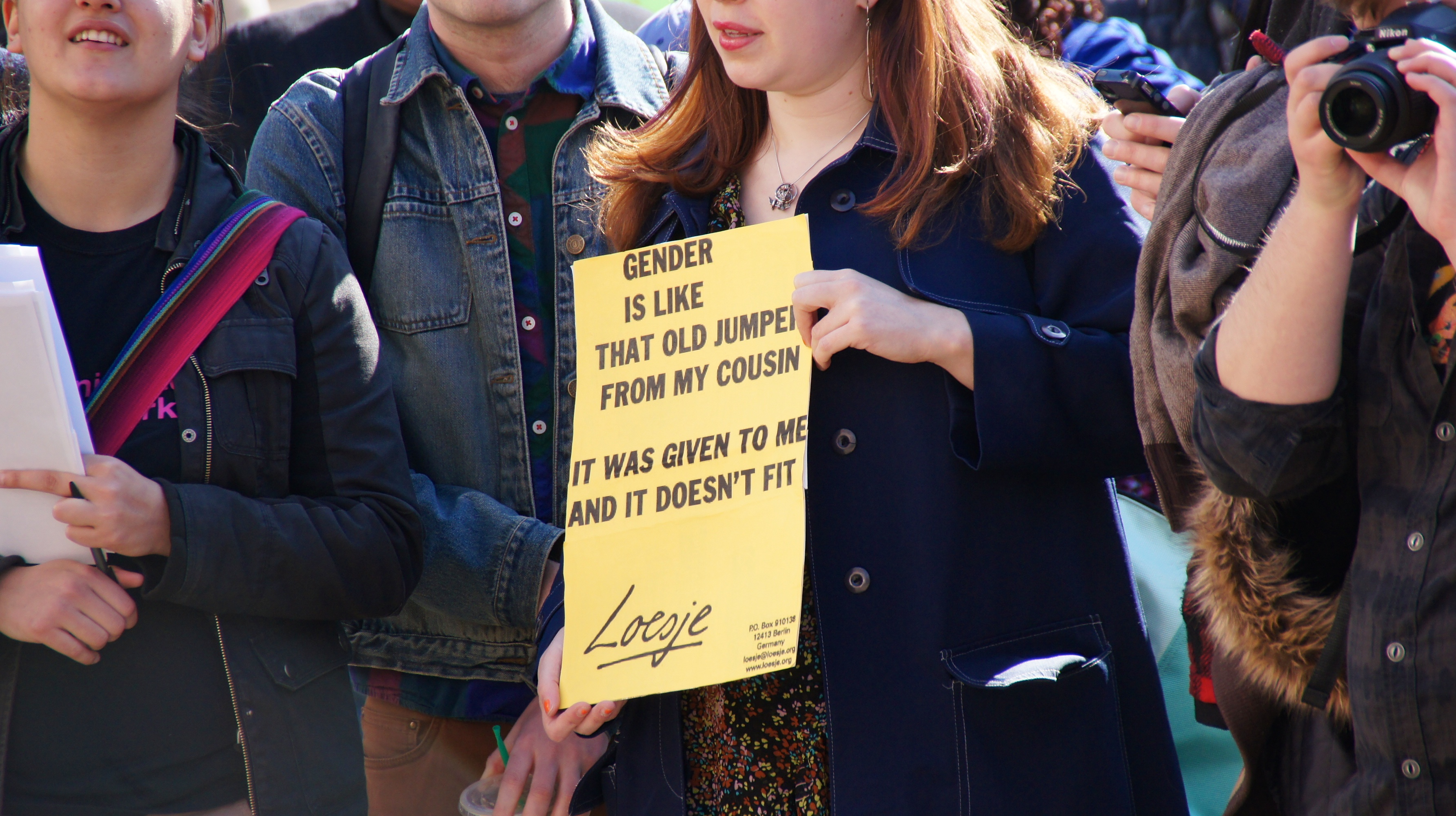
A protester holding a flyer with the words "Gender is like that old jumper from my cousin. It was given to me and it doesn't fit" at a rally for transgender equality in Washington D.C. in 2013

Categorizing males and females into social roles creates a problem for some individuals who feel they have to be at one end of a linear spectrum and must identify themselves as man or woman, rather than being allowed to choose a section in between. Globally, communities interpret biological differences between men and women to create a set of social expectations that define the behaviors that are "appropriate" for men and women and determine their different access to rights, resources, power in society and health behaviors. Although the specific nature and degree of these differences vary from one society to the next, they still tend to typically favor men, creating an imbalance in power and gender inequalities within most societies. Many cultures have different systems of norms and beliefs based on gender, but there is no universal standard to a masculine or feminine role across all cultures. Social roles of men and women in relation to each other is based on the cultural norms of that society, which lead to the creation of gender systems. The gender system is the basis of social patterns in many societies, which include the separation of sexes, and the primacy of masculine norms.

Philosopher Michel Foucault said that as sexual subjects, humans are the object of power, which is not an institution or structure, rather it is a signifier or name attributed to "complex strategical situation". Because of this, "power" is what determines individual attributes, behaviors, etc. and people are a part of an ontologically and epistemologically constructed set of names and labels. For example, being female characterizes one as a woman, and being a woman signifies one as weak, emotional, and irrational, and incapable of actions attributed to a "man". Butler said that gender and sex are more like verbs than nouns. She reasoned that her actions are limited because she is female. "I am not permitted to construct my gender and sex willy-nilly," she said. "[This] is so because gender is politically and therefore socially controlled. Rather than 'woman' being something one is, it is something one does." Some analyses of Judith Butler's theories critique her writing for reinforcing the very conventional dichotomies of gender.

==== Social assignment and gender fluidity ====
According to gender theorist Kate Bornstein, gender can have ambiguity and fluidity. There are two contrasting ideas regarding the definition of gender, and the intersection of both of them is definable as below:

The World Health Organization defines gender as "the characteristics of women, men, girls and boys that are socially constructed". The beliefs, values and attitude taken up and exhibited by them is as per the agreed upon norms of the society and the personal opinion of the person is not taken into the primary consideration of assignment of gender and imposition of gender roles as per the assigned gender.

The assignment of gender involves taking into account the physiological and biological attributes assigned by nature followed by the imposition of the socially constructed conduct. Gender is a term used to exemplify the attributes that a society or culture constitutes as "masculine" or "feminine". Although a person's sex as male or female stands as a biological fact that is identical in any culture, what that specific sex means in reference to a person's gender role as a man or a woman in society varies cross-culturally according to what things are considered to be masculine or feminine. These roles are learned from various, intersecting sources such as parental influences, the socialization a child receives in school, and what is portrayed in the local media. Learning gender roles starts from birth and includes seemingly simple things like what color outfits a baby is clothed in or what toys they are given to play with. However, a person's gender does not always align with what has been assigned at birth. Factors other than learned behaviors play a role in the development of gender.

The article Adolescent Gender-Role Identity and Mental Health: Gender Intensification Revisited focuses on the work of Heather A. Priess, Sara M. Lindberg, and Janet Shibley Hyde on whether or not girls and boys diverge in their gender identities during adolescent years. The researchers based their work on ideas previously mentioned by Hill and Lynch in their gender intensification hypothesis in that signals and messages from parents determine and affect their children's gender role identities. This hypothesis argues that parents affect their children's gender role identities and that different interactions spent with either parents will affect gender intensification. Priess and among other's study did not support the hypothesis of Hill and Lynch which stated "that as adolescents experience these and other socializing influences, they will become more stereotypical in their gender-role identities and gendered attitudes and behaviors." However, the researchers did state that perhaps the hypothesis Hill and Lynch proposed was true in the past but is not true now due to changes in the population of teens in respect to their gender-role identities.

Authors of "Unpacking the Gender System: A Theoretical Perspective on Gender Beliefs and Social Relations", Cecilia Ridgeway and Shelley Correll, argue that gender is more than an identity or role but is something that is institutionalized through "social relational contexts." Ridgeway and Correll define "social relational contexts" as "any situation in which individuals define themselves in relation to others in order to act." They also point out that in addition to social relational contexts, cultural beliefs plays a role in the gender system. The coauthors argue that daily people are forced to acknowledge and interact with others in ways that are related to gender. Every day, individuals are interacting with each other and comply with society's set standard of hegemonic beliefs, which includes gender roles. They state that society's hegemonic cultural beliefs sets the rules which in turn create the setting for which social relational contexts are to take place. Ridgeway and Correll then shift their topic towards sex categorization. The authors define sex categorization as "the sociocognitive process by which we label another as male or female."

The failure of an attempt to raise David Reimer from infancy through adolescence as a girl after his genitals were accidentally mutilated is cited as disproving the theory that gender identity is determined solely by parenting. Reimer's case is used by organizations such as the Intersex Society of North America to caution against needlessly modifying the genitals of unconsenting minors. Between the 1960s and 2000, many other male newborns and infants were surgically and socially reassigned as females if they were born with malformed penises, or if they lost their penises in accidents. At the time, surgical reconstruction of the vagina was more advanced than reconstruction of the penis, leading many doctors and psychologists, including John Money who oversaw Reimer's case, to recommend sex reassignment based on the idea that these patients would be happiest living as women with functioning genitalia. Available evidence indicates that in such instances, parents were deeply committed to raising these children as girls and in as gender-typical a manner as possible. A 2005 review of these cases found that about half of natal males reassigned female lived as women in adulthood, including those who knew their medical history, suggesting that gender assignment and related social factors has a major, though not determinative, influence on eventual gender identity.

In 2015, the American Academy of Pediatrics released a webinar series on gender, gender identity, gender expression, transgender, etc. In the first lecture Sherer explains that parents' influence (through punishment and reward of behavior) can influence gender expression but not gender identity. Sherer argued that kids will modify their gender expression to seek reward from their parents and society, but this will not affect their gender identity (their internal sense of self).

==== Societal categories ====
o

Gender symbols

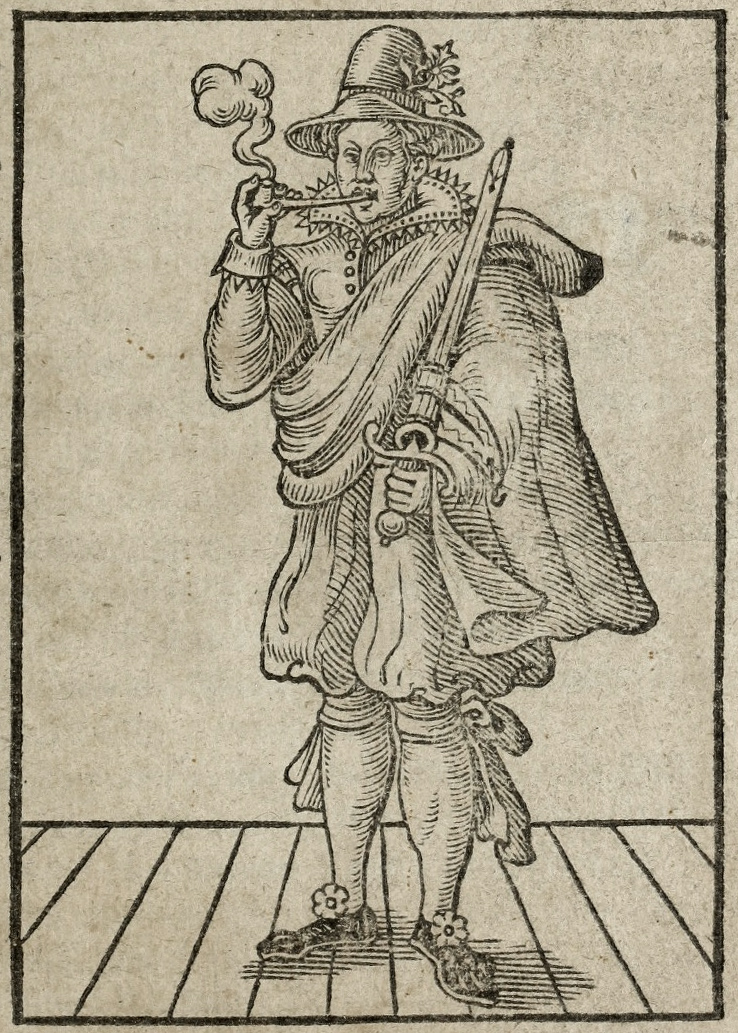
Mary Frith ("Moll Cutpurse") scandalized 17th century society by wearing male clothing, smoking in public, and otherwise defying gender roles.

Sexologist John Money coined the term gender role in 1955. The term gender role is defined as the actions or responses that may reveal their status as boy, man, girl or woman, respectively. Elements surrounding gender roles include clothing, speech patterns, movement, occupations, and other factors not limited to biological sex. In contrast to taxonomic approaches, some feminist philosophers have argued that gender "is a vast orchestration of subtle mediations between oneself and others", rather than a "private cause behind manifest behaviours".

===== Non-binary and third genders =====
Historically, most societies have recognized only two distinct, broad classes of gender roles, a binary of masculine and feminine, largely corresponding to the biological sexes of male and female. When a baby is born, society allocates the child to one gender or the other, on the basis of what their genitals resemble.

However, some societies have historically acknowledged and even honored people who fulfill a gender role that exists more in the middle of the continuum between the feminine and masculine polarity. For example, the Hawaiian māhū, who occupy "a place in the middle" between male and female, or the Ojibwe ikwekaazo, "men who choose to function as women", or ininiikaazo, "women who function as men". In the language of the sociology of gender, some of these people may be considered third gender, especially by those in gender studies or anthropology. Contemporary Native American and FNIM people who fulfill these traditional roles in their communities may also participate in the modern, two-spirit community, however, these umbrella terms, neologisms, and ways of viewing gender are not necessarily the type of cultural constructs that more traditional members of these communities agree with.

The hijras of India and Pakistan are often cited as third gender. Another example may be the muxe (pronounced [ˈmuʃe]), found in the state of Oaxaca, in southern Mexico. The Bugis people of Sulawesi, Indonesia have a tradition that incorporates all the features above.

In addition to these traditionally recognized third genders, many cultures now recognize, to differing degrees, various non-binary gender identities. People who are non-binary (or genderqueer) have gender identities that are not exclusively masculine or feminine. They may identify as having an overlap of gender identities, having two or more genders, having no gender, having a fluctuating gender identity, or being third gender or other-gendered. Recognition of non-binary genders is still somewhat new to mainstream Western culture, and non-binary people may face increased risk of assault, harassment, and discrimination.

==== Measurement of gender identity ====
Two instruments incorporating the multidimensional nature of masculinity and femininity have dominated gender identity research: The Bem Sex-Role Inventory (BSRI) and the Personal Attributes Questionnaire (PAQ). Both instruments categorize individuals as either being sex typed (males report themselves as identifying primarily with masculine traits, females report themselves as identifying primarily with feminine traits), cross sex-typed (males report themselves as identifying primarily with feminine traits, females report themselves as identifying primarily with masculine traits), androgynous (either males or females who report themselves as high on both masculine and feminine traits) or undifferentiated (either males or females who report themselves as low on both masculine and feminine traits). Twenge (1997) noted that men are generally more masculine than women and women generally more feminine than men, but the association between biological sex and masculinity/femininity is waning.

=== Social construction of sex hypotheses ===
The World Health Organization states "As a social construct, gender varies from society to society and can change over time." Sociologists generally regard gender as a social construct. For instance, Ann Oakley, a professor of sociology and social policy, says "the constancy of sex must be admitted, but so also must the variability of gender." Lynda Birke, a feminist biologist, maintains "'biology' is not seen as something which might change."

However, there are scholars who argue that sex is also socially constructed. For example, gender studies writer Judith Butler states that "perhaps this construct called 'sex' is as culturally constructed as gender; indeed, perhaps it was always already gender, with the consequence that the distinction between sex and gender turns out to be no distinction at all."

They continue:

It would make no sense, then, to define gender as the cultural interpretation of sex, if sex is itself a gender-centered category. Gender should not be conceived merely as the cultural inscription of meaning based on a given sex (a juridical conception); gender must also designate the very apparatus of production whereby the sexes themselves are established. [...] This production of sex as the pre-discursive should be understood as the effect of the apparatus of cultural construction designated by gender.

Butler argues that "bodies only appear, only endure, only live within the productive constraints of certain highly gendered regulatory schemas," and sex is "no longer as a bodily given on which the construct of gender is artificially imposed, but as a cultural norm which governs the materialization of bodies."

With regard to history, Linda Nicholson, a professor of history and women's studies, argues that the understanding of human bodies as sexually dimorphic was historically not recognised. She states that male and female genitals were considered inherently the same in Western society until the 18th century. At that time, female genitals were regarded as incomplete male genitals, and the difference between the two was conceived as a matter of degree. In other words, there was a belief in a gradation of physical forms, or a spectrum. Scholars such as Helen King, Joan Cadden, and Michael Stolberg have criticized this interpretation of history. Cadden notes that the "one-sex" model was disputed even in ancient and medieval medicine, and Stolberg points out that already in the sixteenth century, medicine had begun to move towards a two-sex model.

In addition, drawing from the empirical research of intersex children, Anne Fausto-Sterling, a professor of biology and gender studies, describes how the doctors address the issues of intersexuality. She starts her argument with an example of the birth of an intersexual individual and maintains "our conceptions of the nature of gender difference shape, even as they reflect, the ways we structure our social system and polity; they also shape and reflect our understanding of our physical bodies." Then she adds how gender assumptions affects the scientific study of sex by presenting the research of intersexuals by John Money et al., and she concludes that "they never questioned the fundamental assumption that there are only two sexes, because their goal in studying intersexuals was to find out more about 'normal' development." She also mentions the language the doctors use when they talk with the parents of the intersexuals. After describing how the doctors inform parents about the intersexuality, she asserts that because the doctors believe that the intersexuals are actually male or female, they tell the parents of the intersexuals that it will take a little bit more time for the doctors to determine whether the infant is a boy or a girl. That is to say, the doctors' behavior is formulated by the cultural gender assumption that there are only two sexes. Lastly, she maintains that the differences in the ways in which the medical professionals in different regions treat intersexual people also give us a good example of how sex is socially constructed. In her Sexing the Body: gender politics and the construction of sexuality, she introduces the following example:

A group of physicians from Saudi Arabia recently reported on several cases of XX intersex children with congenital adrenal hyperplasia (CAH), a genetically inherited malfunction of the enzymes that aid in making steroid hormones. [...] In the United States and Europe, such children, because they have the potential to bear children later in life, are usually raised as girls. Saudi doctors trained in this European tradition recommended such a course of action to the Saudi parents of CAH XX children. A number of parents, however, refused to accept the recommendation that their child, initially identified as a son, be raised instead as a daughter. Nor would they accept feminizing surgery for their child. [...] This was essentially an expression of local community attitudes with [...] the preference for male offspring.

Thus it is evident that culture can play a part in assigning gender, particularly in relation to intersex children.

== Psychology and sociology ==
Many of the more complicated human behaviors are influenced by both innate factors and by environmental ones, which include everything from genes, gene expression, and body chemistry, through diet and social pressures. A large area of research in behavioral psychology collates evidence in an effort to discover correlations between behavior and various possible antecedents such as genetics, gene regulation, access to food and vitamins, culture, gender, hormones, physical and social development, and physical and social environments.

A core research area within sociology is the way human behavior operates on itself, in other words, how the behavior of one group or individual influences the behavior of other groups or individuals. Starting in the late 20th century, the feminist movement has contributed extensive study of gender and theories about it, notably within sociology but not restricted to it.

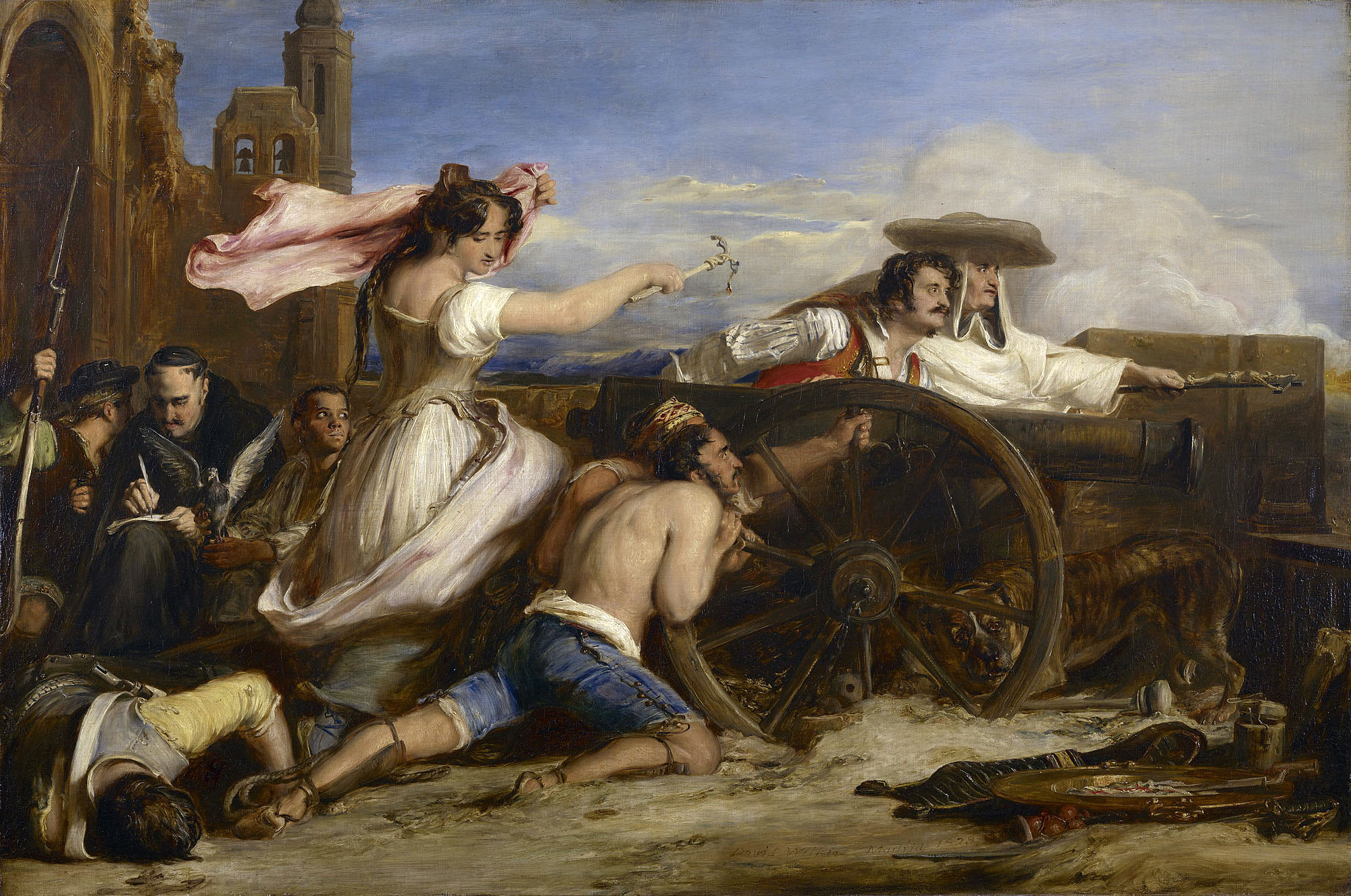
The Defence of Saragossa by David Wilkie, 1828. Spain's desperate situation when invaded by Napoleon enabled Agustina de Aragón to break into a closely guarded male preserve and become the only female professional officer in the Spanish Army of her time (and long afterwards).

Social theorists have sought to determine the specific nature of gender in relation to biological sex and sexuality, with the result being that culturally established gender and sex have become interchangeable identifications that signify the allocation of a specific 'biological' sex within a categorical gender. The second wave feminist view that gender is socially constructed and hegemonic in all societies, remains current in some literary theoretical circles, Kira Hall and Mary Bucholtz publishing new perspectives as recently as 2008.

As the child grows, "...society provides a string of prescriptions, templates, or models of behaviors appropriate to the one sex or the other," which socialises the child into belonging to a culturally specific gender. There is huge incentive for a child to concede to their socialisation with gender shaping the individual's opportunities for education, work, family, sexuality, reproduction, authority, and to make an impact on the production of culture and knowledge. Adults who do not perform these ascribed roles are perceived from this perspective as deviant and improperly socialized.

Some believe society is constructed in a way that splits gender into a dichotomy via social organisations that constantly invent and reproduce cultural images of gender. Joan Acker believed gendering occurs in at least five different interacting social processes:

- The construction of divisions along the lines of gender, such as those produced by labor, power, family, the state, even allowed behaviors and locations in physical space
- The construction of symbols and images such as language, ideology, dress and the media, that explain, express and reinforce, or sometimes oppose, those divisions
- Interactions between men and women, women and women and men and men that involve any form of dominance and submission. Conversational theorists, for example, have studied the way that interruptions, turn taking and the setting of topics re-create gender inequality in the flow of ordinary talk
- The way that the preceding three processes help to produce gendered components of individual identity, i.e., the way they create and maintain an image of a gendered self
- Gender is implicated in the fundamental, ongoing processes of creating and conceptualising social structures.

Looking at gender through a Foucauldian lens, gender is transfigured into a vehicle for the social division of power. Gender difference is merely a construct of society used to enforce the distinctions made between what is assumed to be female and male, and allow for the domination of masculinity over femininity through the attribution of specific gender-related characteristics. "The idea that men and women are more different from one another than either is from anything else, must come from something other than nature... far from being an expression of natural differences, exclusive gender identity is the suppression of natural similarities."

Gender conventions play a large role in attributing masculine and feminine characteristics to a fundamental biological sex. Socio-cultural codes and conventions, the rules by which society functions, and which are both a creation of society as well as a constituting element of it, determine the allocation of these specific traits to the sexes. These traits provide the foundations for the creation of hegemonic gender difference. It follows then, that gender can be assumed as the acquisition and internalisation of social norms. Individuals are therefore socialized through their receipt of society's expectations of 'acceptable' gender attributes that are flaunted within institutions such as the family, the state and the media. Such a notion of 'gender' then becomes naturalized into a person's sense of self or identity, effectively imposing a gendered social category upon a sexed body.

The conception that people are gendered rather than sexed also coincides with Judith Butler's theories of gender performativity. Butler argues that gender is not an expression of what one is, but rather something that one does. It follows then, that if gender is acted out in a repetitive manner it is in fact re-creating and effectively embedding itself within the social consciousness. Contemporary sociological reference to male and female gender roles typically uses masculinities and femininities in the plural rather than singular, suggesting diversity both within cultures as well as across them.

The difference between the sociological and popular definitions of gender involve a different dichotomy and focus. For example, the sociological approach to "gender" (social roles: female versus male) focuses on the difference in (economic/power) position between a male CEO (disregarding the fact that he is heterosexual or homosexual) to female workers in his employ (disregarding whether they are straight or gay). However the popular sexual self-conception approach (self-conception: gay versus straight) focuses on the different self-conceptions and social conceptions of those who are gay/straight, in comparison with those who are straight (disregarding what might be vastly differing economic and power positions between female and male groups in each category). There is then, in relation to definition of and approaches to "gender", a tension between historic feminist sociology and contemporary homosexual sociology.

== Gender as biopsychosocial ==
According to Alex Iantaffi, Meg-John Barker, and others, gender is biopsychosocial. This is because it is derived from biological, psychological, and social factors, with all three factors feeding back into each other to form a person's gender.

Biological factors such as sex chromosomes, hormones, and anatomy play a significant role in the development of gender. Hormones such as testosterone and estrogen also play a crucial role in shaping gender identity and expression. Anatomy, including genitalia and reproductive organs, can also influence one's gender identity and expression.

Psychological factors such as cognition, personality, and self-concept also contribute to gender development. Gender identity emerges around the age of two to three years. Gender expression, which refers to the outward manifestation of gender, is influenced by cultural norms, personal preferences, and individual differences in personality.

Social factors such as culture, socialization, and institutional practices shape gender identity and expression.

In some English literature, there is also a trichotomy between biological sex, psychological gender, and social gender role. This framework first appeared in a feminist paper on transsexualism in 1978.

== Gender and society ==
=== Languages ===
- Grammatical gender is a property of some languages in which every noun is assigned a gender, often with no direct relation to its meaning. For example, the word for "girl" is muchacha (grammatically feminine) in Spanish, Mädchen (grammatically neuter) or the older Maid (grammatically feminine) in German, and cailín (grammatically masculine) in Irish.
- The term "grammatical gender" is often applied to more complex noun class systems. This is especially true when a noun class system includes masculine and feminine as well as some other non-gender features like animate, edible, manufactured, and so forth. An example of the latter is found in the Dyirbal language. Other gender systems exist with no distinction between masculine and feminine; examples include a distinction between animate and inanimate things, which is common to, amongst others, Ojibwe, Basque and Hittite; and systems distinguishing between people (whether human or divine) and everything else, which are found in the Dravidian languages and Sumerian.
- A sample of the World Atlas of Language Structures by Greville G Corbett found that fewer than half of the 258 languages sampled have any system of grammatical gender. Of the remaining languages that feature grammatical gender, over half have more than the minimum requirement of two genders. Grammatical gender may be based on biological sex (which is the most common basis for grammatical gender), animacy, or other features, and may be based on a combination of these classes. One of the four genders of the Dyirbal language consists mainly of fruit and vegetables. Languages of the Niger-Congo language family can have as many as twenty genders, including plants, places, and shapes.
- Many languages include terms that are used asymmetrically in reference to men and women. Concern that current language may be biased in favor of men has led some authors in recent times to argue for the use of a more gender-neutral vocabulary in English and other languages.
- Several languages attest the use of different vocabulary by men and women, to differing degrees. See, for instance, Gender differences in Japanese. The oldest documented language, Sumerian, records a distinctive sub-language, Emesal, only used by female speakers. Conversely, many Indigenous Australian languages have distinctive registers with a limited lexicon used by men in the presence of their mothers-in-law (see Avoidance speech). As well, quite a few sign languages have a gendered distinction due to boarding schools segregated by gender, such as Irish Sign Language.
- Several languages such as Persian or Hungarian are gender-neutral. In Persian the same word is used in reference to men and women. Verbs, adjectives and nouns are not gendered. (See Gender-neutrality in genderless languages).
- Several languages employ different ways to refer to people where there are three or more genders, such as Navajo

=== Legal status ===
A person's gender can have legal significance. In some countries and jurisdictions there are same-sex marriage laws.

==== Transgender people ====
The legal status of transgender people varies greatly around the world. Some countries have enacted laws protecting the rights of transgender individuals, but others have criminalized their gender identity or expression. Many countries now legally recognize sex reassignments by permitting a change of legal gender on an individual's birth certificate.

==== Intersex people ====
For intersex people, who according to the UN Office of the High Commissioner for Human Rights, "do not fit typical binary notions of male or female bodies", access to any form of identification document with a gender marker may be an issue. For other intersex people, there may be issues in securing the same rights as other individuals assigned male or female; other intersex people may seek non-binary gender recognition.

==== Non-binary and third genders ====
Some countries now legally recognize non-binary or third genders, including Canada, Germany, Australia, New Zealand, India and Pakistan. In the United States, Oregon was the first state to legally recognize non-binary gender in 2017, and was followed by California and the District of Columbia.

=== Science ===
Historically, science has been portrayed as a masculine pursuit in which women have faced significant barriers to participate. Even after universities began admitting women in the 19th century, women were still largely relegated to certain scientific fields, such as home science, nursing, and child psychology. Women were also typically given tedious, low-paying jobs and denied opportunities for career advancement. This was often justified by the stereotype that women were naturally more suited to jobs that required concentration, patience, and dexterity, rather than creativity, leadership, or intellect. Although these stereotypes have been dispelled in modern times, women are still underrepresented in prestigious "hard science" fields such as physics, and are less likely to hold high-ranking positions, a situation global initiatives such as the United Nations Sustainable Development Goal 5 are trying to rectify.

=== Religion ===
This topic includes internal and external religious issues such as gender of God and deities creation myths about human gender, roles and rights (for instance, leadership roles especially ordination of women, sex segregation, gender equality, marriage, abortion, homosexuality).

Yin and yang

In Taoism, yin and yang are considered feminine and masculine, respectively. The Taijitu and concept of the Zhou period reach into family and gender relations. Yin is female and yang is male. They fit together as two parts of a whole. The male principle was equated with the sun: active, bright, and shining; the female principle corresponds to the moon: passive, shaded, and reflective. Thus "male toughness was balanced by female gentleness, male action and initiative by female endurance and need for completion, and male leadership by female supportiveness."

In Judaism, God is traditionally described in the masculine, but in the mystical tradition of the Kabbalah, the Shekhinah represents the feminine aspect of God's essence. However, Judaism traditionally holds that God is completely non-corporeal, and thus neither male nor female. Conceptions of the gender of God notwithstanding, traditional Judaism places a strong emphasis on individuals following Judaism's traditional gender roles, though many modern denominations of Judaism strive for greater egalitarianism. Moreover, traditional Jewish culture recognizes at least six genders.

In Christianity, God is traditionally described in masculine terms and the Church has historically been described in feminine terms. On the other hand, Christian theology in many churches distinguishes between the masculine images used of God (Father, King, God the Son) and the reality they signify, which transcends gender, embodies all the virtues of both men and women perfectly, which may be seen through the doctrine of Imago Dei. In the New Testament, Jesus at several times mentions the Holy Spirit with the masculine pronoun i.e. John 15:26 among other verses. Hence, the Father, the Son and the Holy Spirit (i.e. Trinity) are all mentioned with the masculine pronoun; though the exact meaning of the masculinity of the Christian triune God is contested.

In Hinduism, one of the several forms of the Hindu god Shiva is Ardhanarishvara (literally half-female god). In this composite form, the left half of the body represents shakti (energy, power) in the form of the goddess Parvati (otherwise his consort) while the right half represents Shiva. Whereas Parvati is regarded to be the cause of arousal of kama (desire), Shiva is the destroyer of the concept. Symbolically, Shiva is pervaded by the power of Parvati and Parvati is pervaded by the power of Shiva.

This myth projects an inherent view in ancient Hinduism, that each human carries within himself both female and male components, which are forces rather than sexes, and it is the harmony between the creative and the annihilative, the strong and the soft, the proactive and the passive, that makes a true person. Evidence of homosexuality, bisexuality, androgyny, multiple sex partners, and open representation of sexual pleasures are found in artworks like the Khajuraho temples, believed to have been accepted within prevalent social frameworks.

=== Poverty ===
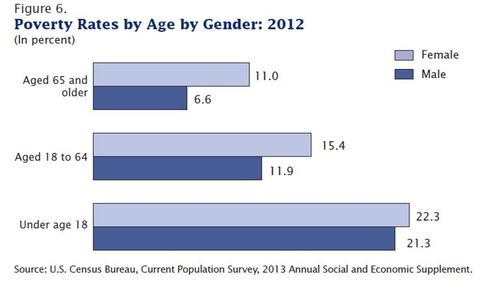
A bar graph comparing poverty differences based on age and gender in 2012.

Gender inequality is most common in women dealing with poverty. Many women must shoulder all the responsibility of the household because they must take care of the family. Oftentimes this may include tasks such as tilling land, grinding grain, carrying water and cooking. Also, women are more likely to earn low incomes because of gender discrimination, as men are more likely to receive higher pay, have more opportunities, and have overall more political and social capital then women. Approximately 75% of world's women are unable to obtain bank loans because they have unstable jobs. It shows that there are many women in the world's population but only a few represent world's wealth. In many countries, the financial sector largely neglects women even though they play an important role in the economy, as Nena Stoiljkovic pointed out in D+C Development and Cooperation. In 1978 Diana M. Pearce coined the term feminization of poverty to describe the problem of women having higher rates of poverty. Women are more vulnerable to chronic poverty because of gender inequalities in the distribution of income, property ownership, credit, and control over earned income. Resource allocation is typically gender-biased within households, and continue on a higher level regarding state institutions.

Gender and Development (GAD) is a holistic approach to give aid to countries where gender inequality has a great effect of not improving the social and economic development. It is a program focused on the gender development of women to empower them and decrease the level of inequality between men and women.

The largest discrimination study of the transgender community, conducted in 2013, found that the transgender community is four times more likely to live in extreme poverty (income of less than $10,000 a year) than people who are cisgender.

=== General strain theory ===
According to general strain theory, studies suggest that gender differences between individuals can lead to externalized anger that may result in violent outbursts. These violent actions related to gender inequality can be measured by comparing violent neighborhoods to non-violent neighborhoods. By noticing the independent variables (neighborhood violence) and the dependent variable (individual violence), it is possible to analyze gender roles. The strain in the general strain theory is the removal of a positive stimulus and or the introduction of a negative stimulus, which would create a negative effect (strain) within individual, which is either inner-directed (depression/guilt) or outer-directed (anger/frustration), which depends on whether the individual blames themselves or their environment. Studies reveal that even though males and females are equally likely to react to a strain with anger, the origin of the anger and their means of coping with it can vary drastically.

Males are likely to put the blame on others for adversity and therefore externalize feelings of anger. Females typically internalize their angers and tend to blame themselves instead. Female internalized anger is accompanied by feelings of guilt, fear, anxiety and depression. Women view anger as a sign that they've somehow lost control, and thus worry that this anger may lead them to harm others and/or damage relationships. On the other end of the spectrum, men are less concerned with damaging relationships and more focused on using anger as a means of affirming their masculinity. According to the general strain theory, men would more likely engage in aggressive behavior directed towards others due to externalized anger whereas women would direct their anger towards themselves rather than others.

=== Economic development ===
Gender, and particularly the role of women, is widely recognized as vitally important to international development issues. This often means a focus on gender-equality, ensuring participation, but includes an understanding of the different roles and expectation of the genders within the community.

=== Climate change ===
Gender is a topic of increasing concern within climate change policy and science. Generally, gender approaches to climate change address gender-differentiated consequences of climate change, as well as unequal adaptation capacities and gendered contribution to climate change. Furthermore, the intersection of climate change and gender raises questions regarding the complex and intersecting power relations arising from it. These differences, however, are mostly not due to biological or physical differences, but are formed by the social, institutional and legal context. Subsequently, vulnerability is less an intrinsic feature of women and girls but rather a product of their marginalization. Roehr notes that, while the United Nations officially committed to gender mainstreaming, in practice gender equality is not reached in the context of climate change policies. This is reflected in the fact that discourses of and negotiations over climate change are mostly dominated by men. Some feminist scholars hold that the debate on climate change is not only dominated by men but also primarily shaped in 'masculine' principles, which limits discussions about climate change to a perspective that focuses on technical solutions. This perception of climate change hides subjectivity and power relations that actually condition climate-change policy and science, leading to a phenomenon that Tuana terms 'epistemic injustice'. Similarly, MacGregor attests that by framing climate change as an issue of 'hard' natural scientific conduct and natural security, it is kept within the traditional domains of hegemonic masculinity.

=== Social media ===
Forbes published an article in 2010 that reported 57% of Facebook users are women, which was attributed to the fact that women are more active on social media. On average, women have 8% more friends and account for 62% of posts that are shared via Facebook. Another study in 2010 found that in most Western cultures, women spend more time sending text messages compared to men as well as spending more time on social networking sites as a way to communicate with friends and family.

Research conducted in 2013 found that over 57% of pictures posted on social networking sites were sexual and were created to gain attention. Moreover, 58% of women and 45% of men do not look into the camera, which creates an illusion of withdrawal. Other factors to be considered are the poses in pictures such as women lying down in subordinate positions or even touching themselves in childlike ways.

Adolescent girls generally use social networking sites as a tool to communicate with peers and reinforce existing relationships; boys on the other hand tend to use social networking sites as a tool to meet new friends and acquaintances. Furthermore, social networking sites have allowed individuals to truly express themselves, as they are able to create an identity and socialize with other individuals that can relate. Social networking sites have also given individuals access to create a space where they feel more comfortable about their sexuality. Recent research has indicated that social media is becoming a stronger part of younger individuals' media culture, as more intimate stories are being told via social media and are being intertwined with gender, sexuality, and relationships.

Research has found that almost all U.S. teens (95%) aged 12 through 17 are online, compared to only 78% of adults. Of these teens, 80% have profiles on social media sites, as compared to only 64% of the online population aged 30 and older. According to a study conducted by the Kaiser Family Foundation, 11-to-18-year-olds spend on average over one and a half hours a day using a computer and 27 minutes per day visiting social network sites, i.e. the latter accounts for about one fourth of their daily computer use.

Studies have shown that female users tend to post more "cute" pictures, while male participants were more likely to post pictures of themselves in activities. Women in the U.S. also tend to post more pictures of friends, while men tend to post more about sports and humorous links. The study also found that males would post more alcohol and sexual references. The roles were reversed however, when looking at a teenage dating site: women made sexual references significantly more often than males. Boys share more personal information, while girls are more conservative about the personal information they post. Boys, meanwhile, are more likely to orient towards technology, sports, and humor in the information they post to their profile.

Research in the 1990s suggested that different genders display certain traits, such as being active, attractive, dependent, dominant, independent, sentimental, sexy, and submissive, in online interaction. Even though these traits continue to be displayed through gender stereotypes, recent studies show that this is not necessarily the case any more.

== See also ==
- Androcentrism
- Anti-gender movement
- Biological determinism
- Coloniality of gender
- Feminist metaphysics
- Gender and politics
- Gender bender
- Gender paradox
- Gynocentrism
- Postgenderism
- Sex–gender distinction
- Sexism
- Sex ratio

== Bibliography ==
- Butler, Judith (1990). Gender Trouble: Feminism and the Subversion of Identity. Thinking Gender. New York & London: Routledge. ISBN 978-0-415-38955-6.
- Butler, Judith (1993). Bodies That Matter: On the Discursive Limits of "Sex". New York: Routledge. ISBN 978-0-415-61015-5.
- Fausto-Sterling, Anne (2000). Sexing the Body: Gender Politics and the Construction of Sexuality. New York: Basic Books. ISBN 978-0-465-07714-4.
