= Joan Cadden =

Joan Cadden may refer to:

- Joan Cadden (politician)
- Joan Cadden (historian)
