= Sarah Humphreys =

Sarah Humphreys may refer to:

- Sarah C. Humphreys, classical scholar, known as Sally
- Sarah Gibson Humphreys (1830–1907), author and suffragist

== See also ==
- Sara Humphreys, American romance writer
