= Solitary Sex =

2003 non-fiction book by Thomas W. Laqueur

Solitary Sex: A Cultural History of Masturbation
- Author: Thomas W. Laqueur
- Publisher: Zone Books
- Publication date: 2003
- ISBN: 978-1-890-95133-7

Solitary Sex: A Cultural History of Masturbation is a non-fiction book by American historian and sexologist Thomas W. Laqueur. It was published in 2003 by Zone Books. It discusses the history of masturbation, which Laqueur argues that western cultural perceptions of masturbation changed to be much more negative in the 18th century, a shift which he dates to the c. 1712 publication of anti-masturbation pamphlet Onania: or, the heinous sin of self-pollution.

In a review in The Guardian, author Ian Sansom compared the book to masturbation in the sense that he found it "voluminous, occasionally repetitive, and undoubtedly fascinating". The Journal of Modern History also found the author's claims interesting, and praised Laqueur's writing and attention to detail. The reviewer also called the book unique, in part due to what they described as its status of one of the first complete books about masturbation. Historian Edward Shorter felt that the book was not so much a history of masturbation as a history of the cultural perceptions of masturbation. He also disagreed with several of Laqueur's claims, including his idea that masturbation became stigmatized in part due to the private nature of the act.
