= Thomas W. Laqueur =

American sexologist and historian

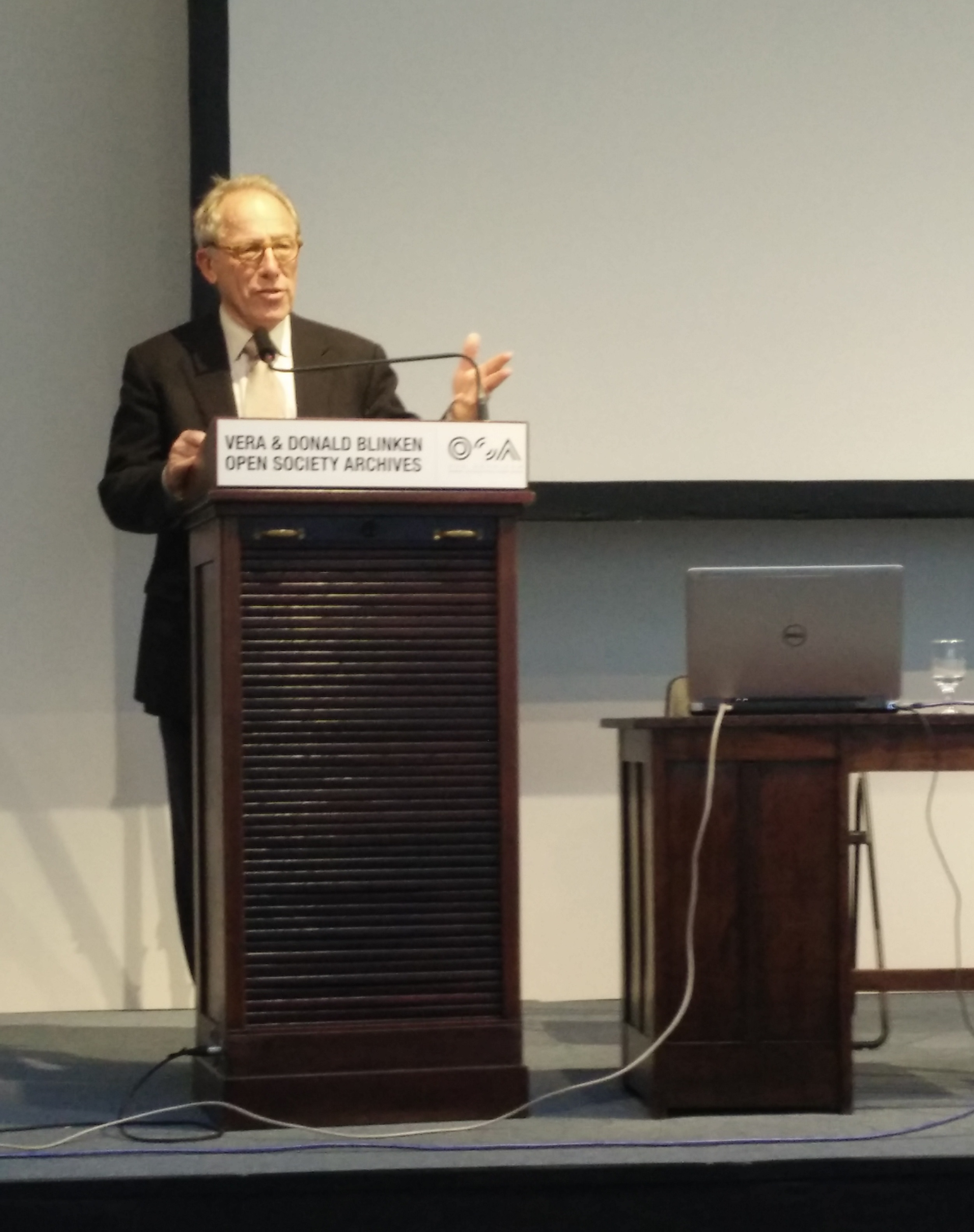
- Laqueur at the Blinken Open Society Archives in Budapest, May 2016.
- Born: Thomas Walter Laqueur; September 6, 1945 (age 81); Istanbul, Turkey
- Education: Nuffield College, Oxford, Princeton University, Swarthmore College
- Known for: One-sex and two-sex theories
- Awards: Rockefeller Fellowship, Guggenheim Fellowship, Cundill Prize in Historical Literature
- Scientific career
- Fields: History, Sexology
- Workplaces: University of California, Berkeley

Thomas Walter Laqueur (born September 6, 1945) is an American historian, sexologist and writer. He is the author of Solitary Sex: A Cultural History of Masturbation and Making Sex: Body and Gender from the Greeks to Freud as well as many articles and reviews. He is the winner of the Andrew W. Mellon Foundation's 2007 Distinguished Achievement Award, and is currently the Helen Fawcett Distinguished Professor of History Emeritus at the University of California, Berkeley, located in Berkeley, California. Laqueur was elected to the American Philosophical Society in 2015.

== One-sex model ==
Laqueur wrote that there was an ancient "one-sex model", in which the woman was only described as imperfect man / human and he postulates that definitions of sex/gender were historically different and changeable.

This argument has been challenged by some historians of science and experts in Early Modernity, notably Katharine Park and Robert A. Nye; Monica Green, Heinz-Jürgen Voss, Helen King, and Paola Uparela, who reject the suggestion that ancient descriptions show a homogenous model, the one-sex model which then mutated in the 18th century to a two-sex model. They encourage a more differentiated perception that makes clear that gender theories of natural philosophy as well as biology and medicine, are embedded and constructed in certain social contexts.

== Bibliography ==
=== Books ===
- Laqueur, Thomas (2026). The Dog's Gaze: A Visual History. New York: Penguin Press. ISBN 978-0-593652-79-4.
- Laqueur, Thomas (2015). The Work of the Dead: A Cultural History of Mortal Remains. Princeton: Princeton University Press. ISBN 978-0-691157-78-8.
- Laqueur, Thomas (2004). Solitary Sex: A Cultural History of Masturbation. Brooklyn: Zone Books. ISBN 1-890951-32-3.
- Laqueur, Thomas (1990). Making Sex: Body and Gender From the Greeks to Freud. Cambridge: Harvard University Press. ISBN 0-674-54349-1.
- Gallagher, Catherine; Laqueur, Thomas (1987). The Making of the Modern Body: Sexuality and Society in the Nineteenth Century. Berkeley: University of California Press. ISBN 0-520-05960-3.
- Laqueur, Thomas (1976). Religion and Respectability: Sunday Schools and Working Class Culture, 1780–1850. New Haven: Yale University Press. ISBN 0-300-01859-2.

=== Selected articles ===
- "The Queen Caroline Affair: Politics as Art in the Reign of George IV," The Journal of Modern History Vol. 54, No. 3, September 1982
- Laqueur, Thomas W. (November 15, 2004). "Come Again? – A History of the Orgasm Completely Misses the Point". Slate.

== See also ==
- List of non-fiction writers
- List of University of California, Berkeley faculty
