= Genders (surname) =

Genders is a surname. Notable people with the surname include:

- Anselm Genders (1919–2008), Bishop of Bermuda
- Peter Genders (born 1959), Australian canoeist in the 1984 Olympics
- Roy Genders (1913–1985), English cricketer
- William Genders (1890–1971), British cyclist in the 1920 Olympics
