= Sex Differences in Cognitive Abilities =

Book by Diane Halpern

Sex Differences in Cognitive Abilities (ISBN 9780805827927) is a book by Diane Halpern published by Lawrence Erlbaum Associates in 2000, and now in its fourth edition. Halpern served as president of the American Psychological Association in 2004.

At the time [I started writing this book], it seemed clear to me that any between-sex differences in thinking abilities were due to socialization practices, artifacts, and mistakes in the research. After reviewing a pile of journal articles that stood several feet high and numerous books and book chapters that dwarfed the stack of journal articles, I changed my mind.

Halpern writes that sex differences in cognitive abilities can be caused by a "stereotype threat", defined as "the fear of conforming to a negative stereotype associated with one's group membership, which paradoxically results in the individual behaving in line with the stereotype". If an individual is made aware of a stereotype then "the activation of stereotypes might explain why the magnitude of sex differences in sex-sensitive cognitive task varies across studies, depending on whether participants gender-stereotypes are activated or not".

== See also ==
- Biology of gender
- Sex and psychology
