= Diane F. Halpern =

American psychologist

Diane F. Halpern is an American psychologist and former president of the American Psychological Association (APA). She is Dean of Social Science at the Minerva Schools at KGI (Keck Graduate Institute) and also the McElwee Family Professor of Psychology at Claremont McKenna College. She is also a former president of the Western Psychological Association, The Society for the Teaching of Psychology, and the Division of General Psychology.

Halpern served on boards and panels at the APA including the Board of Educational Affairs, the Council of Representatives, the Committee on International Relations in Psychology, the Committee on Learning Outcomes, and Teachers of Psychology in Secondary Schools. She chaired the Panel on Public Policy and APA's National Conference on Undergraduate Education that resulted in the publication Undergraduate Education in Psychology: A Blueprint for the Future of the Discipline.

Along with Keith Millis (Northern Illinois University) and Arthur C. Graesser (University of Memphis), Halpern developed Operation ARA, a computerized game that teaches scientific reasoning. She also developed the Halpern Critical Thinking Assessment (Schuhfried Publishers) that uses multiple response formats which allow test-takers to demonstrate their ability to think about everyday topics using both constructed response and recognition formats.

Halpern received her B.A. from the University of Pennsylvania and an M.A. from Temple University. She then received an M.A., from the University of Cincinnati, followed by a Ph.D. from that institution in 1979. After teaching for many years at the California State University, San Bernardino, she is currently Professor of Psychology at Claremont McKenna College.

In 1995, Halpern was part of an 11-member APA task force led by Ulric Neisser which published Intelligence: Knowns and Unknowns, a report written in response to The Bell Curve. She has also written on cognitive differences between men and women. She suggests a biopsychosocial model offers superior insight into cognitive sex differences than a simple nature-vs-nurture dichotomy. Another topic of her research is risks associated with left-handedness. Halpern has also written in opposition of single-sex schooling, noting that it "lacks scientific support and may exaggerate sexism and gender stereotyping".

== Publications ==
- Halpern, D. F. (2014). Thought and Knowledge: An Introduction to Critical Thinking (5th Edition). NY: Psychology Press.
- Halpern, D. F. (2012). Sex Differences in Cognitive Abilities (4th ed.). NY: Psychology Press.
- Halpern, D. F. (Ed.). (2009). Undergraduate Education in Psychology: A Blueprint for the Future of the Discipline. Washington, DC: American Psychological Association Books.
- Halpern, D. F., & Cheung, F. M. (2008). Women at the Top: How Powerful Leaders Combine Work and Family. NY: Wiley-Blackwell Publishers.
- Miller, D. I., & Halpern, D. F. (2014). The New Science of Cognitive Sex Differences. Trends in Cognitive Sciences, 18, 37–45. doi: 10.1016/j.tics.2013.10.011
- Nisbett, R. E., Aronson, J., Blair, C., Dickens, W., Flynn, J., Halpern, D. F. & Turkheimer, E. (2012). Intelligence: New findings and theoretical developments. American Psychologist, 67, 130–159. doi: 10.1037/a0026699
- Halpern, D. F., Eliot, L., Bigler, R. S., Fabes, R. A., Hanish, L. D., Hyde, J. S., Liben, L., & Martin, C. L. (2011, September 23). The pseudoscience of single-sex schooling. Science, 333, 1706–1707. DOI: 10.1126/science.1205031
- Cheung, F. M., & Halpern, D. F. (2010). Women at the Top: Powerful Leaders Define Success as Work + Family in a Culture of Gender. American Psychologist, 65, 182-193 doi: 10.1037/a0017309.
- Halpern, D. F. (2005). Psychology at the intersection of work and family: Recommendations for employers, working families, and policy makers. American Psychologist, 60, 367–409.
- Halpern, D. F. & Murphy, S.E. (Eds.). (2005). From Work-Family Balance to Work-Family Interaction: Changing the Metaphor. Mahwah, NJ: Lawrence Erlbaum Associates, Inc. Publishers.
- Halpern, D. F. (2005). "How time-flexible work policies can reduce stress, improve health, and save money". Stress and Health, 21.
- Halpern, D. F. (2004). "A cognitive-process taxonomy for sex differences in cognitive abilities". Current Directions in Psychological Science, 13 (4), 135–139.
- Halpern, D. F. (2003). Thought and Knowledge: An Introduction to Critical Thinking (4th Edition). Mahwah, NJ: Lawrence Erlbaum Associates, Inc. Publishers. Also published in Russian (2003).
- Halpern, D. F. & Riggio, H. (2003). Thinking Critically About Critical Thinking (4th ed.) Mahwah, NJ: Lawrence Erlbaum Associates, Inc. Publishers. (with separate instructors' manual)
- Halpern, D. F., & Hakel, M. D. (2003). "Applying the Science of Learning to the University and Beyond: Teaching for Long-Term Retention and Transfer". Change, July/August, 2–13.
- Halpern, D. F., & Hakel, M. D. (Eds.), (2002). Applying the Science of Learning to the University and Beyond. New Directions for Teaching and Learning. San Francisco: Jossey-Bass.
- Halpern, D. F. (2000). Sex Differences in Cognitive Abilities (3rd Edition). Mahwah, NJ: Lawrence Erlbaum, Associates, Inc. Publishers.
- Halpern, D. F. (1997). Critical Thinking Across the Curriculum: A Brief Edition of Thought and Knowledge. Mahwah, NJ: Lawrence Erlbaum Associates, Inc. Also published in Spanish (2000).
- Halpern, D. F., & Voiskounsky, A. E. (Eds.), (1997). States of Mind: American & Post-Soviet Perspectives on Contemporary Issues in Psychology. NY: Oxford University Press.

== Awards and honors ==
Halpern has won awards for her teaching and research, including:

- 2013 James McKeen Cattell Award from the Association for Psychological Science (APS) (highest award given by APS)
- 2013 American Psychological Foundation Arthur W. Staats Award
- 2013 Raymond D. Fowler Award for Outstanding Contributions to the American Psychological Association
- 2009 George A. Miller Award for the outstanding journal article in psychology
- 2004 Honorary Doctorate of Humane Letters (Ph.D.) Mount St. Mary's College (Los Angeles)
- 2002 Outstanding Professor Award from the Western Psychological Association
- 1998 American Psychological Foundation (APF) Charles L. Brewer Distinguished Teaching Award
- 1996 Distinguished Career Award for Contributions to Education given by the American Psychological Association
- 1996 California State University's State-Wide Outstanding Professor Award
- 1996 Outstanding Alumna Award from the University of Cincinnati
- 1996 Silver Medal Award from the Council for the Advancement and Support of Education
