= Sally Humphreys =

Classics scholar

Sarah C. "Sally" Humphreys (8 September 1934 - 27 February 2024) was a classical scholar and professor of History, Anthropology, and Greek at the University of Michigan in Ann Arbor, Michigan. Her work focused on ancient Greece, uniting the theories and methods of history with those of social anthropology.

== Life ==
Humphreys (née Hinchliffe) studied Greek language and literature, ancient history, and philosophy at Somerville College, Oxford, graduating with a Bachelor of Arts (BA) degree in 1957: as per tradition, her BA was promoted to a Master of Arts degree in 1959. In 1955, she and Penny Minney, a fellow-student at Somerville, bought a keelless lifeboat and converted it into a sailing ship, in which they covered over 1,500 miles over the following four years. Humphreys cited her experiences on these voyages as a major influence on her scholarship. Minney published an account of them in 2017, entitled Crab's Odyssey: Malta to Istanbul in an Open Boat.

After holding research fellowships at the University of Oxford, she became an academic librarian at the Warburg Institute in London in 1965. She collaborated with Arnaldo Momigliano in running the Ancient History Seminar, before she took up a lectureship at University College London in 1972. At the same time, Humphreys also set up a joint honours degree in Ancient History and Social Anthropology. In 1985, she became a professor at the University of Michigan at Ann Arbor, and then at Central European University, Budapest. Humphreys also held visiting professorships at several institutions including the Wissenschaftskolleg and Max Planck Institut fur Wissenschaftsgeschichte in Berlin, the Ecole des Hautes Etudes en Sciences Sociales in Paris, the Institute for History and Philosophy of Science in Tel Aviv, the Davis Center at Princeton University, The Internationales Forschungszentrum fur Kulturwissenschaften in Vienna, and University of Utrecht.

=== Scholarship ===
Humphreys applied theories and methodologies from anthropology to ancient history, as demonstrated in her 1978 collection of essays Anthropology and the Greeks. The book has been described as, "the best overview of the ways in which scholars of Greek and Roman culture used and abused anthropological ideas." In it, Humphreys explained that her inspiration was a technological question concerning the design and use of ancient Greek ships, which she approached by sailing around the Aegean in an open, keelless boat. She realized that while much remained the same as it was in the ancient world (for example, the winds and sailing conditions), much has changed, and that changes in economic institutions were more important than those in sailing technology. The analysis of social and economic structures was central to her subsequent work. She has also used the lens of anthropology to explore ancient law, family structures and kinship. Her second collection of essays, The Family, Women and Death: Comparative Studies, was published in 1983. Her third book, The Strangeness of Gods: Historical perspectives on the interpretation of Athenian religion, followed in 2004. A conference she ran in 2008, Modernity's Classics, examined how a range of cultures used their 'classics' to discuss the challenges of modernity; the proceedings were published in 2013. A two-volume collection of her extensive work on kinship was published in 2018.

== Publications ==
- Review of Meyer Fortes, Kinship and the Social Order. Comparative Studies in Society and History 14 (1972) 126–8.
- contribution to discussion in Economia e Società (1973) 71-7
- 'The nothoi of Kynosarges', Journal of Hellenic Studies 94 (1974) 88-95
- and Arnaldo Momigliano, 'The social structure of the ancient city', Annali della Scuola Normale Superiore di Pisa. Classe di Lettere e Filosofia Serie III, Vol. 4, No. 2 (1974), 331-367
- Anthropology and the Greeks (1978)
- 'Family Tombs and Tomb Cult in Ancient Athens: Tradition or Traditionalism?', Journal of Hellenic Studies 100 (1980) 96-126
- and Helen King (eds), Mortality and Immortality: The Anthropology and Archaeology of Death (1981)
- 'Fustel de Coulanges and the Greek genos', Sociologia del Diritto 9 (1982-3) 37-44
- The Family, Women and Death: Comparative Studies (1983)
- 'Law as discourse' in The Discourse of Law, History and Anthropology 1 (1985) 241-264
- 'Fustel de Coulanges'
- 'A historical approach to Drakon's law on homicide', Symposion 1990: Vorträge zur griechischen und hellenistischen Rechtsgeschichte (Pacific Grove, California, 24.-26. September 1990) (1991)
- (editor) Cultures of Scholarship (1997)
- 'Fragments, fetishes, and philosophies: towards a history of Greek historiography after Thucydides, in Glenn W. Most (ed.), Collecting Fragments-Fragmente sammeln (1997)
- The Strangeness of Gods: Historical perspectives on the interpretation of Athenian religion (2004)
- and Rudolf Wagner, Modernity's Classics (2013)
- Kinship in Ancient Athens: An anthropological analysis (2 vols) (2018)
