= Joan Cadden (historian) =

American historian of science (born 1944)

- Born: 1944 (age 81–82)
- Occupation: Historian of science
- Known for: Meanings of Sex Difference in the Middle Ages: Medicine, Science, and Culture (1993)
- Awards: Pfizer Award (1994)

Academic background
- Education: Vassar College (AB 1965); Columbia University (MA 1967); Indiana University Bloomington (PhD 1971)
- Thesis: The Medieval Philosophy and Biology of Growth

Academic work
- Discipline: History of science
- Sub-discipline: Medieval history; Gender and sexuality
- Institutions: Harvard University (1971–1976); Kenyon College (1978–1996); University of California, Davis (1996–present (emeritus))

Joan Cadden (born 1944) is professor emerita of medieval history and literature in the History Department of the University of California, Davis. She served as president of the History of Science Society (HSS) from 2006 to 2007. She has written extensively on gender and sexuality in medieval science and medicine. Her book Meanings of Sex Difference in the Middle Ages: Medicine, Science, and Culture (1993) received the Pfizer Award in 1994, from the History of Science Society, as the outstanding book on the history of science.

== Early life and education ==
Joan Cadden received her A.B. from Vassar College in 1965, and her M.A. degree from Columbia University in 1967, writing her thesis on De elementis: Earth, Water, Air, and Fire in the 12th and 13th Centuries. She completed her Ph.D. in history and philosophy of science at Indiana University Bloomington in 1971. Her Ph.D. thesis was The Medieval Philosophy and Biology of Growth: Albertus Magnus, Thomas Aquinas, Albert of Saxony and Marsilius of Inghen on Book I, Chapter V of Aristotle's 'De generatione et corruptione,' with Translated Texts of Albertus and Thomas Aquinas.

== Career ==
Cadden taught as an assistant professor in the Department of History of Science at Harvard University from 1971 to 1976. She was a visiting lecturer in history at the University of Colorado, Boulder in 1977-1978. She taught at Kenyon College from 1978 to 1996. She was a Dibner Visiting Historian of Science at Purdue University Calumet in 1996-1997. She joined the University of California, Davis in 1996 as Professor of History. Cadden served as president of the History of Science Society (HSS) from 2006 to 2007. She retired and became Professor Emeritus at UC Davis in 2008.

Her work has been characterized as exploring the "seams of disciplines"—the connections between history of science, gender history, history of sexuality, social history, and intellectual history. Methodologically, she broke new ground, paying "particular attention to the cultural and social milieux these sources were produced in; to the assumptions and expectations of authors and readers; to questions of form, style, and presentation."

Her book Meanings of Sex Difference in the Middle Age: Medicine, Science, and Culture (1993) was groundbreaking in its examination of sex and gender, and has deeply influenced subsequent scholarship. Cadden examines the discussions of sexual difference from Aristotle through the fourteenth century, revealing a wide range of ideas about sexual determination, reproductive roles and sexual pleasure. She finds multiple models of sexuality in writings throughout the middles ages. This challenged Thomas Laqueur's assertion in Making Sex: Body and Gender from the Greeks to Freud (1990) that male and female were seen as "manifestations of a unified substratum" before the 18th century. Cadden addressed medieval discourse in all its "staggering complexity", an "interconnectedness of intellectual interests" that was "far from comforting" in its diversity.

She went on to research Pietro D'Abano and to explore the complexities of medieval natural philosophers' understanding of homosexual desire in her book Nothing Natural Is Shameful: Sodomy and Science in Late Medieval Europe (2013). Although she recognizes its limitations, she uses the medieval term "sodomy" to avoid conflation with modern senses of the term "homosexuality". Discussion focuses around Aristotle's Problemata IV.26 and its questioning of male-male sexual desire. The book has been described as "a sophisticated reflection on sex and sexuality."

== Awards ==
Her book Meanings of Sex Difference in the Middle Age: Medicine, Science, and Culture (1993) received the 1994 Pfizer Award for outstanding book on the history of science from the History of Science Society. It was the first book on gender studies, and the first book in thirty years on medieval studies, to win that award.

Her work was celebrated at two sessions at the 44th annual International Congress on Medieval Studies in Kalamazoo, Michigan in 2009 by the Society for Medieval Feminist Scholarship. The Medieval Foremothers Society honored Joan Cadden in the sessions "Thinking beyond the 'Woman Writer' in Reconstructing Women's Intellectual Worlds," and "(New) Meanings of Sex Difference in the Middle Ages: Medicine, Science, and Culture (A Roundtable)." These were later published in the Medieval Feminist Forum (2010).

"By listening to multiple voices and embodying synthesis in her own life and career, Joan has allowed us to see a Middle Ages that was always there but was waiting for a skilled interpreter to reveal it." - Monica Green
