= Robert Stoller =

American psychiatrist (1924–1991)

- Born: Robert Jesse Stoller; 15 December 1924; Crestwood, New York, U.S.
- Died: 6 July 1991 (aged 66); Los Angeles, California, U.S.
- Known for: Gender studies Conversion therapy
- Scientific career
- Fields: Psychoanalysis

Robert Jesse Stoller (December 15, 1924 – September 6, 1991) was an American professor of psychiatry at UCLA Medical School and a researcher at the UCLA Gender Identity Clinic. He has been criticized for research into finding the cause of transgender identities with intent to prevent them, and later similar research he inspired.

He was the author of nine books, the co-author of three others, and the publisher of over 115 articles.

Stoller is known for his theories concerning the development of gender identity, which he is credited as having coined in 1964. Stoller is also known for his theories concerning the dynamics of sexual excitement.

In 2010, Richard Green published "Robert Stoller's Sex and Gender: 40 Years On" in the Archives of Sexual Behavior, which analyzed the contributions of the book and his research overall in the field of transgender healthcare.

== Biography ==
Robert Stoller was born on December 15, 1924, in Crestwood, New York. His parents were Russian-Jewish immigrants.

In 1958, a patient pseudonymously referred to as Agnes was referred to Stoller and Harold Garfinkel. At the time, Agnes was 17 years old and pretended to be intersex in order to receive gender confirming surgery. Years later, Stoller learned that Agnes was actually a transgender girl who had been stealing her mother's estrogen supplements since 12 years old. Upon learning this, Stoller recalled the papers he had written and retracted his earlier findings at the 1968 International Psychoanalytic Congress in Copenhagen.

Research by Richard Green, Stoller, and Craig MacAndrew in 1966 revealed that most physicians and psychiatrists were opposed to gender confirming surgery, even if the patient had received years of psychotherapy and would probably be suicidal if denied surgery.

In 1968, Stoller wrote Sex and Gender, where he hypothesized "The sense of core gender identity...is derived from three sources: the anatomy and physiology of the genitalia; the attitudes of parents, siblings and peers toward the child's gender role; and a biological force that may more or less modify the attitudinal (environmental) forces." In it, he argued that sex changes should be utilized as a research technique but only offered to those termed "true transexuals", those who "had been very feminine in childhood, had never lived acceptably in a masculine role, and who had not derived pleasure from their penis (p 251)." However, these criteria became widely influential and most patients would use the "winning psychosexual history", as therapy shifted from analysis of transgender people to a stepping stone to transition.

In the same book, Stoller endorsed conversion therapy targeted towards children, "The condition is pathological....If these boys are the adult transsexuals of future years, with their demands for sex transformation procedures and the reportedly hopeless prognosis for psychiatric treatment, then the time to help them is in childhood, when their gender identity is still forming....The goal of treatment should be to make the child feel that he is a male and wants to be a masculine boy....The first step in treatment is to establish that one is in fact dealing with a childhood transsexual. Next one must start treatment immediately. If one waits until five or six or seven, the undoing is more difficult."

In 1972, Green, Newman, and Stoller published Treatment of Boyhood "Transsexualism" , which detailed attempts to prevent young children from growing up to be transgender based on the observation that attempts to change gender failed in older children. The treatment involved having the parents discourage feminine behavior and making sure they don't inadvertently encourage it, having the father take a more active role in the child's life as a masculine role model, and having the mother not be "overly close" with the child.

In his most notable contribution, Perversion (1975), Stoller attempts to illuminate the dynamics of sexual perversion and normalize it. Stoller suggests that perversion inevitably entails an expression of unconscious aggression in the form of revenge against a person who, in early years, made some form of threat to the child's core gender identity, either in the form of overt trauma or through the frustrations of the Oedipal conflict.

In Sexual Excitement (1979), Stoller finds the same perverse dynamics at work in all sexual excitement on a continuum from overt aggression to subtle fantasy. In focusing on the unconscious fantasy, and not the behavior, Stoller provides a way of analyzing the mental dynamics of sexuality, what he terms "erotics," while simultaneously de-emphasizing the pathology of any particular form of behavior. Stoller does not consider homosexuality as a monolithic behavior but rather as a range of sexual styles as diverse as heterosexuality. Many of Stoller's books, like Splitting (1973), are devoted to the documentation of the interviews on which he based his research.

Stoller died in a traffic accident near his home in 1991.

== Selected publications ==
- Stoller, Robert; Sex and Gender: On the Development of Masculinity and Femininity, Science House, New York City (1968) 383 p.
- Stoller, Robert; Sex and Gender: the Transsexual Experiment, Hogarth Press, (1968) 328 p.
- Stoller, Robert; Splitting: A Case of Female Masculinity, Quadrangle, New York, (1973) 395 p.
- Stoller, Robert; Perversion: The Erotic Form of Hatred, Pantheon, New York, (1975), 240 p.
- Stoller, Robert; Sexual Excitement: Dynamics of Erotic Life, Pantheon, New York (1979), 281 p.
- Stoller, Robert; Presentations of Gender, Yale University Press (1985), 219 p.
- Stoller, Robert; Observing the Erotic Imagination, Yale University Press, New Haven, (1985), 228 p.
- Stoller, Robert; Pain & Passion. A Psychoanalyst Explores the World of S & M, Plenum Press, New York, (1991), 306p.
- Herdt, Gilbert, & Robert. J. Stoller, Intimate Communications: Erotics and the Study of Culture, New York, Columbia University Press (1990), 467 p.

== See also ==
- John Money
