= Gender paradox =

Gender paradox could refer to:

- Gender paradox in suicide
- Boy or girl paradox – Paradox in probability theory
- Gender-equality paradox – Concept in psychology and sociology
- Gender paradox (sociolinguistics) – Attested sociolinguistic relationship between gender and language change
