= Helen King (classicist) =

British historian (born 1957)

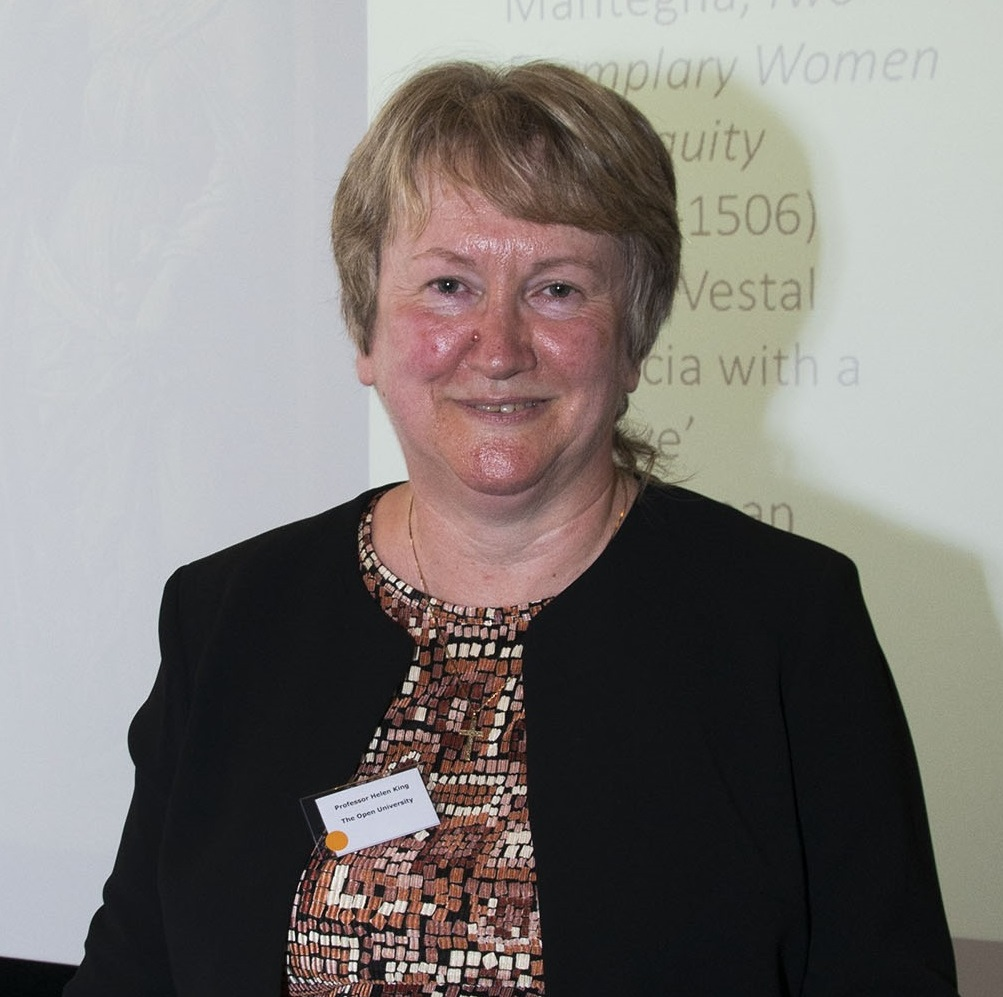
- Professor King in 2016
- Born: 1957 (age 68–69)

Academic background
- Education: University College London

Academic work
- Discipline: Classics
- Sub-discipline: Ancient medicine
- Institutions: University of Reading; Open University

Helen King (born 1957) is a British classical scholar and advocate for the medical humanities. She is Professor Emerita of Classical Studies at the Open University. She was previously Professor of the History of Classical Medicine and Head of the Department of Classics at the University of Reading.

== Early life and education ==
King was born in 1957. She completed her first degree at University College London in Ancient History and Social Anthropology. She gained her doctorate at UCL in 1985 for a PhD on menstruation in ancient Greece supervised by Sarah C. (Sally) Humphreys. Her thesis was entitled From 'parthenos' to 'gyne': the Dynamics of Category.

== Academic career ==
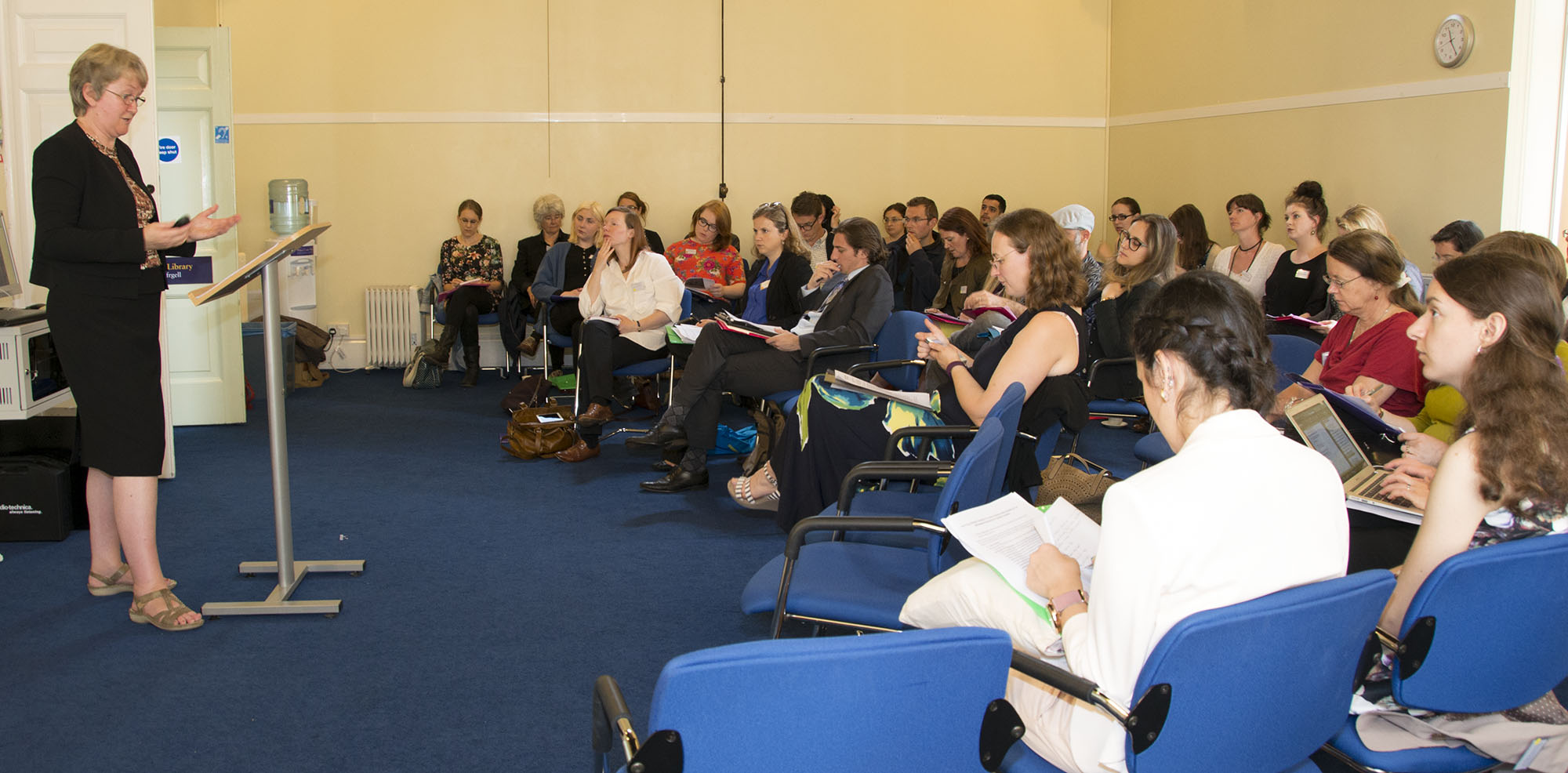
Helen King delivering her keynote lecture, Cardiff University, 2016

Having completed her doctorate, King held research fellowships at the universities of Cambridge and Newcastle, taught at the Liverpool Institute of Higher Education for eight years, and moved to Reading on a Wellcome Trust University Award in 1996. From 2008 she was also visiting professor at the Peninsula Medical School in Truro. She moved to the Open University to assume the role of Professor of Classical Studies in 2011. She retired in January 2017 and took up the position of Robert E. and Susan T. Rydell Visiting Professor 2017–2018 at Gustavus Adolphus College, St Peter, MN.

King was a Women's Studies Area Advisor to the Oxford Classical Dictionary (1996). She has been a Fellow at the Netherlands Institute for Advanced Studies (2001), a Landsdowne Visiting Lecturer at the University of Victoria, British Columbia (2002), a visiting professor at the University of Texas at Austin (2005), a Käthe Leichter Visiting Professor in Women's Studies and Gender Studies at the University of Vienna (2014) and Provost's Distinguished Women Lecturer, Notre Dame, IN (2016). King has appeared on History Cold Case, Tony Robinson's Gods & Monsters, and Harlots, Housewives & Heroines: A 17th Century History for Girls. She has contributed to two episodes of In Our Time on BBC Radio 4, speaking on Galen and The Hippocratic Oath and three episodes of Being Roman, also on Radio 4, with Mary Beard. Following the publication of Immaculate Forms she appeared on three BBC radio shows: Woman's Hour, Start the Week and The Infinite Monkey Cage. In 2025 she joined the judging panel for the Wolfson History Prize.

== Research interests ==
In September 2024, with Profile Books/Wellcome Collection, King published Immaculate Forms: Uncovering the History of Women's Bodies. The US/Canada edition was published in January 2025 by Basic Books. Her first book Hippocrates' Woman: Reading the Female Body in Ancient Greece (1998) analysed the practice and theory of ancient medicine as relating to women and how it continues to influence thought to the present day. Immaculate Forms focuses on a similarly broad time period and investigates changing beliefs about the breasts, clitoris, hymen and womb.

In her 2007 book, Midwifery, Obstetrics and the Rise of Gynaecology: The Uses of a Sixteenth-Century Compendium, she examined the uses of ancient medicine in a collection of ancient and medieval works on gynecology produced in three editions, the last being in 1597 by Israel Spach, and the different interpretations of this collection up to James Young Simpson in the nineteenth century.

She has also published on the myths of Tithonos, on mermaids, and on the myth/fable of Agnodice, "the first midwife". She has investigated how this story was used to give authority to women in medical roles in various historical periods.

== Church of England ==
King was a member of the General Synod of the Church of England from 1985 to 1993 and from 2021 to 2026. As part of the 'Historical' thematic working group, she contributed to the Church's 2020 teaching document on human sexuality. She supports same-sex marriage.

She has also spoken about the history of Christianity in a podcast for the Historical Association.

== Select publications ==
- Hippocrates' Woman: Reading the Female Body in Ancient Greece (1998); ISBN 0415138957
- Greek and Roman Medicine (2001). ISBN 9781853995453
- The Disease of Virgins: Green Sickness, Chlorosis and the Problems of Puberty (2004); ISBN 0-203-48710-9
- Health in Antiquity (2005); ISBN 9780415220651
- Midwifery, Obstetrics and the Rise of Gynaecology: The Uses of a Sixteenth-Century Compendium (2007); ISBN 9780754653967
- Blood, Sweat and Tears: The Changing Concepts of Physiology from Antiquity into Early Modern Europe (with Manfred Horstmansoff and Claus Zittel 2012); ISBN 978-90-04-22918-1
- La Médecine dans l' Antiquité grecque et romaine (with Véronique Dasen, 2008); ISBN 9782970053668
- The One-Sex Body on Trial: The Classical and Early Modern Evidence (2013); ISBN 978-1-4094-6335-1
- Hippocrates Now: The 'Father of Medicine' in the Internet Age (2019); ISBN 9781350005891
- Immaculate Forms: Uncovering the History of Women's Bodies (2024) ISBN 978-1-78816-387-3

== See also ==
- Diophantus of Abae
