= Sexism in academia =

Discrimination in higher education

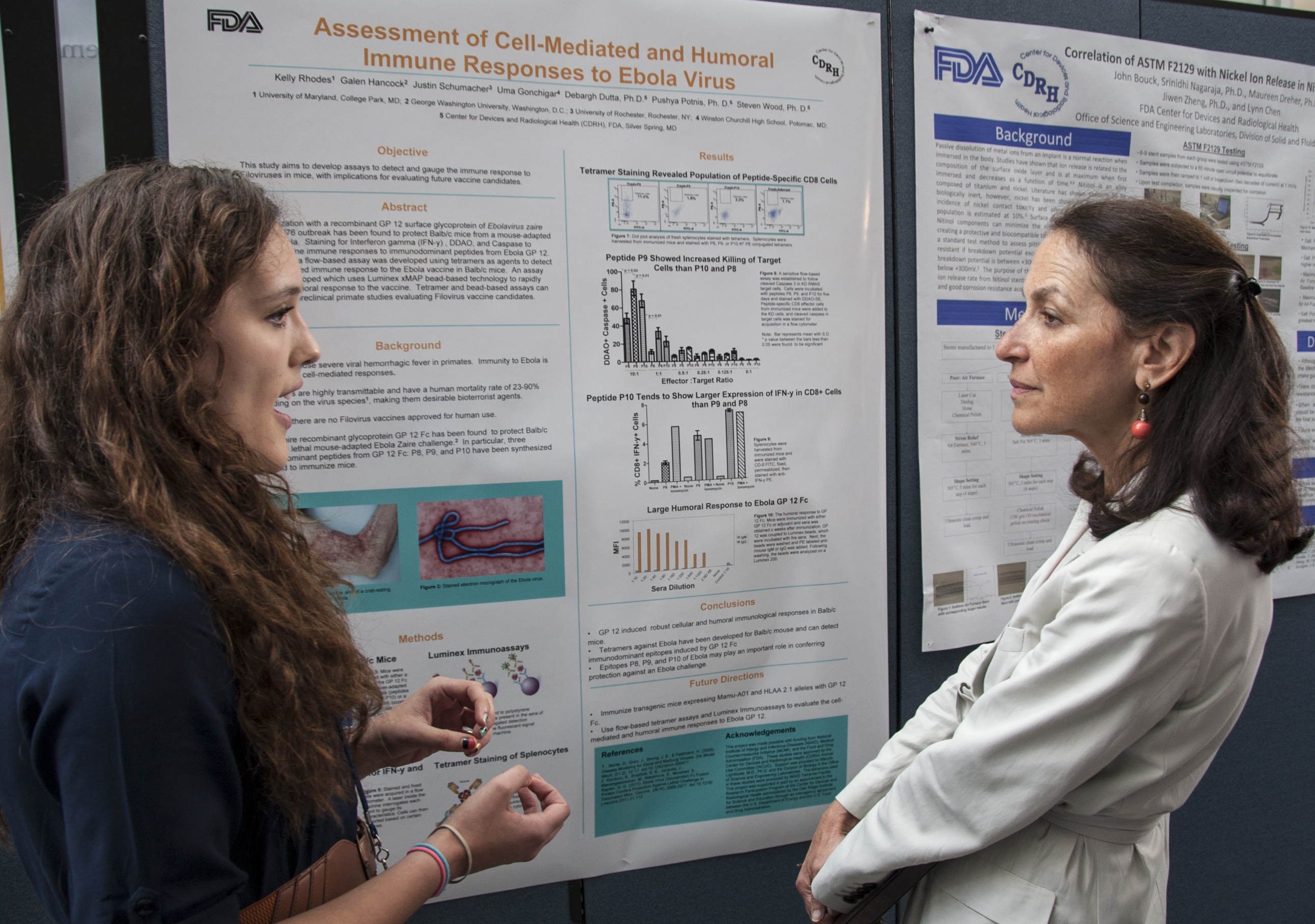
Margaret A. Hamburg (right) listens as a student explains her research at the 2013 the annual Salute to Science Student Poster Symposium, held at the agency's White Oak headquarters in Silver Spring, Maryland, United States.

Students at The University of Houston College of Medicine in Houston, Texas, United States

Sexism in academia refers to the academic bias and discrimination by a particular sex or gender in academic institutions, particularly universities, due to the ideologies, practices, and reinforcements that privilege one sex or gender over another. Sexism in academia is not limited to but primarily affects women who are denied the professional achievements awarded to men in their respective fields such as positions, tenure and awards. Sexism in academia encompasses institutionalized and cultural sexist ideologies; it is not limited to the admission process and the under-representation of women in the sciences but also includes the lack of women represented in college course materials and the denial of tenure, positions and awards that are generally accorded to men.

== Representation ==
Controversy exists over whether women's under-representation in specific academic fields is the result of gender discrimination or of other factors such as personal inclination. Researchers note that as of 2015, women had closed the undergraduate degree gap for several STEM fields including both the social and biological sciences, but, as of 2019, women only account for 21% of the computer science undergraduate degree holders. Likewise, at the master's and doctoral level, the number of STEM degrees obtained by women had increased for many fields; however, only 27% of the master's degrees and 23% of the doctoral degrees in computer science and engineering were held by women.

These claims of equal opportunity in scientific fields of academia are often attributed to women's "preference" and inclination for other fields of study and to teaching instead of research. However, such claims do not take into account that gender is central to the organization of higher education. This might explain women's under-representation in academia at more senior levels, and the way in which the organization of higher education institutions might be structurally disadvantaging women by the institutionalization, practice, and valuing of masculinity which ends up reinforcing hegemonic masculinity. Women are underrepresented in senior positions in the humanities, despite the fact that most students in these fields are women.

== Equal opportunity ==
Some individuals have argued that there are equal opportunities for women and men in sciences and that sexism no longer exists in these fields. For assistant professorship positions in Germany discrimination in favor of women on invitation propensity and perceived qualifications was found in a 2025 vignette study, while for Italy no statistically significant discrimination was found. One adversarial literature synthesis found for the time period 2000 to 2020 gender parity for grant funding, journal acceptances, and recommendation letters; advantages for men were found in course evaluation and in salaries (smaller than widely reported); while advantages for women were found for this time period in hiring. A confirmation bias in the citation of studies on sexism in academia was found.

== Substantive equality ==
However, it has been argued that focusing on equal opportunities among genders is inadequate due to the fact that it is more of a case of gender blindness rather than gender neutrality. For example, the 2011 amendment to the equal opportunities legislation in the United Kingdom enables employers to select an applicant of "equal merit" if the applicant has an attribute that is underrepresented in the workforce or if they experience a disadvantage as a result of the given attribute.

== Tenured positions ==
=== In the United States ===
Women are underrepresented in tenured positions in the United States. From 2001 to 2009, women averaged 35% of all full-time faculty with tenure and 43% of all full-time faculty in non-tenure track positions in comparison to men's 50% and 32%, respectively. A case study performed by Pennsylvania State University in 2006 attributes a majority of this gap to familial commitments and the avoidance strategies they create among faculty members. For instance, it takes approximately between five and seven years for a faculty member to be considered for the position of associate professor with tenure; this system limits caregiving and family responsibilities until tenure is achieved, so faculty members may choose to delay marriage, parenthood, etc. until the desired position is acquired. In particular, the careers of women in academia are greatly hindered because the workplace tends to favor a man's career path. The travel, possibility of relocation and vigorous work schedules limit the participation of women due to family conflicts. A 2019 study made by Boston postdoctoral researchers identified a large discrepancy in mentorship between men- and women-identifying postdocs, in which the latter were much less likely to have a mentor of the same gender, and full-professor mentors were much more likely to be a man. A 2006 national survey, reported 16% of women faculty members remained single because they did not have time for both a family and a successful career; of the women faculty members who were parents, 17.2% chose to have one child but delayed even considering another until they had acquired their desired position. These challenges associated with balancing work life and family life raise questions regarding the influence both marriage and motherhood have on the academic positions available to wives and mothers at colleges and universities. Despite the increased support for family-friendly policies in the academic workplace, few have yet to be utilized fully. Many academic institutions support paid parental leave, tenure-clock stoppage and flexible schedules; however, few faculty members of either gender choose to take advantage of these policies for fear of being penalized by their departments despite the institution's approval.

== Awards ==
Historically, women are less likely to win academic awards. For instance, there are 48 women Nobel Prize winners, compared to 844 men. About two-thirds of these winners won a Nobel Prize for a humanities discipline, not a science discipline. In most scientific disciplines, a small portion of women professors are nominated for awards compared to the number of women in the field. The Recognition of the Achievements of Women In Science, Medicine, and Engineering (RAISE) project has reported that women represent 8.6% of Lasker Award winners.

Although there has been an increase in women's award recognition in recent years, their recognition among service and teaching awards still outweighs recognition among awards for scholarly research. Research shows that women are still less likely to win awards regardless of their representation in the nomination pool due to committees often being predominantly chaired by men, who are much more likely to award men.

There has been an attempt to resolve these issues by highlighting women's work through the addition of awards restricted to women recipients; however, this exacerbates the issue because it confuses the number of awards available and hides the persistent inequality. For example, one study observed how women received 22 of the 108 possible awards; however, 10 of these 22 awards were restricted to women recipients. This demonstrates how women's representation of academic awards can be distorted.

== Women of color ==
Women of color face specific issues related to sexism in academia as well. One such problem is referred to as the "Chilly Climate" problem, wherein, because women of color are infrequent in academia, they are often isolated and face a lack of institutional support. Additionally, because women of color's bodies are both viewed racially and in terms of their gender in academia, their voices and identities are often overlooked through "elite racism," as coined by Allen et al. (2000). Because women of color in academia are sometimes minorities in regards to their colleagues as well as their students, it is suggested that they feel the aforementioned isolation, racism, and sexism from both groups due to their intersectionality.

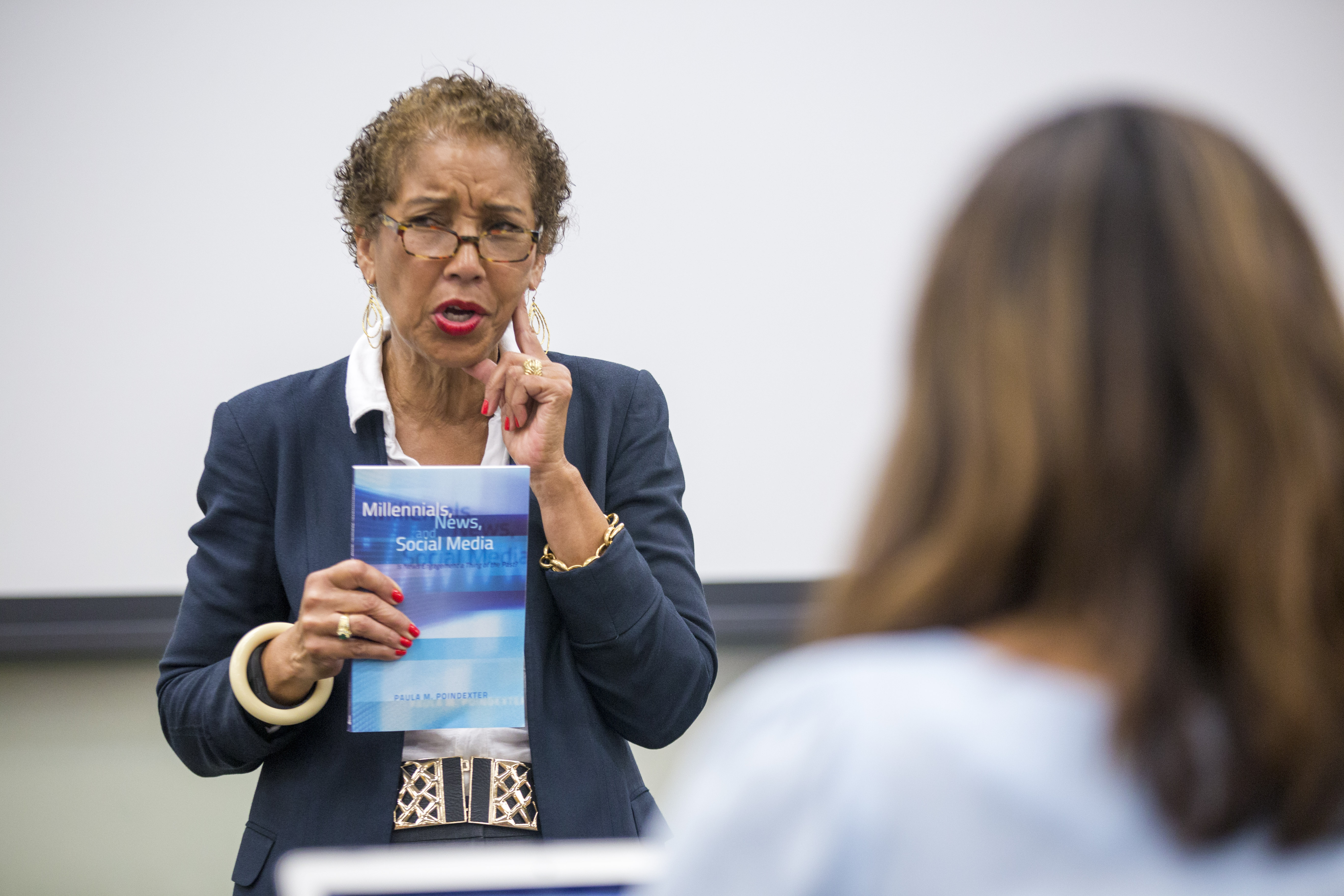
Dr. Paula Poindexter lecturing at the Moody College of Communication at The University of Texas in Austin, Texas, United States

Women of color in academia are not only seemingly ostracized by their colleagues, but by their students as well. Women faculty of color reported having their authority questioned and challenged, their teaching competency questioned, and their knowledge and experience disrespected by their students. White men students were also seen to behave more aggressively towards these women and would also employ intimidating behaviors. Students have accused faculty members of color of having a biased curriculum that is too heavily focused on readings written by people of color, and argue that this takes away from the intended course content. Analyses of gender bias in teacher evaluations have highlighted a pattern of woman professors receiving vastly more negative reviews in comparison to men. This is even more prevalent for women of color, as students tend to unfairly evaluate women of color in academia. These evaluations are significant as they are taken into account by the administration. Receiving negative feedback from students will likely hinder the career growth and professional development of women of color.

According to the National Science Foundation's 2015 survey of doctorate recipients, only 40.41% of U.S. doctorate scientists employed in teaching positions were women, 61,750 out of a sample of 152,800. Of the women population, 75.95% were White, 11.01% were Asian, 5.34% were Hispanic or Latino, 5.67% were Black or African American, 0.32% were American Indian or Alaskan Native, and 1.62% constituted other races, including Native Hawaiian, Pacific Islander, and those who marked multiple races who were not Hispanic or Latino. In addition, Asian women held 3% of tenured positions, Latinas 2.4%, and Black women 2.3%, according to a 2015 survey by the National Center for Education Statistics.

== Authorship ==
Share of female authorship in engineering specialties

In many academic disciplines, women receive less credit for their research than men. This trend is especially pronounced in engineering fields. A study published in 2015 by Gita Ghiasi, Vincent Lariviere, and Cassidy Sugimoto demonstrates that women represent 20% of all scientific production in the field of engineering. The study examined 679,338 engineering articles published between 2008 and 2013, and it analyzed the collaborative networks among 974,837 authors. Ghiasi et al. (2015) created networking diagrams, depicting the frequency of collaboration among authors, and the success of each collaboration was measured by the number of times the study was cited. The collaboration networks illustrate that mixed-gender teams have a higher average rate of productivity and citations, yet 50% of men engineers have collaborated only with other men and 38% of women engineers have collaborated only with men. The researchers use impact factors—the average annual number of citation that a journal receives—to measure the prestige of academic journals. Their study shows that when women publish their research in journals with high-impact factors, they receive fewer citations from the engineering community. The authors explain their findings as a possible consequence of the "Matilda Effect", a phenomenon that systematically undervalues the scientific contributions of women.

In addition to engineering, a gender bias in publishing is exemplified in economics. In 2015, Heather Sarsons released a working paper comparing credit allocated to men and women in collaborative research. Sarsons (2015) analyzed the publication records of economists at top universities over the past 40 years, and found that women economists publish work as frequently as their men cohorts, yet their tenure prospects are less than half that of men. Women receive comparable credit to men when they solo author their work or co-author with other woman economists, evinced by an 8–9% increase in their tenure prospects, implying that tenure prospects decrease with collaborative work due to lack of credit given to women, not the quality of their work. Men receive the same amount of credit for solo authoring and co-authoring their work, shown by an 8–9% increase in their tenure prospects; however, when women co-author with men, there is no increase in their tenure prospects.

In the academic disciplines of political science and international relations, research has found evidence of gender bias in publishing and teaching. The Teaching, Research and International Policy (TRIP) project gathers data and publishes analysis on the discipline of international relations. In 2013, a study published by Daniel Maliniak, Ryan Powers and Barbara F. Walter used TRIP data from peer-reviewed publications between 1980 and 2006 to show that women are systematically cited less than men after controlling for a number of variables including year and venue of publication, substantive focus, theoretical perspective, methodology, tenure status, and institutional affiliation. In a 2017 study on publishing patterns in political science journals, Dawn Langan Teele and Kathleen Thelen found that women authors are underrepresented compared to the share of women working in the profession, are not benefiting from the trend toward co-authored publications (dominated by all-men author teams), and lose out from the methodological partiality of top journals in the field. Activism aimed at uprooting gender bias in academic publishing and teaching has increased over the years and has led to initiatives such as #womenalsoknowstuff, #womenalsoknowhistory, and Jane Lawrence Sumner's Gender Balance Assessment Tool (GBAT). In 2015, Jeff Colgan conducted an analysis of American post-graduate international relations syllabi and found that 82% of assigned reading was written by all-men authors. At the London School of Economics, a student-led body called the Gender and Diversity Project (GDP) conducted a similar assessment of syllabi from the full teaching curriculum in the International Relations department from 2015 to 2016. The results, published in 2018 (see Kiran Phull, Gokhan Ciflikli and Gustav Meibauer), revealed that 79.2% of assigned reading from all undergraduate, graduate, and post-graduate syllabi was authored exclusively by men authors, with the undergraduate curriculum being the least gender-diverse.

The COVID-19 pandemic proved to have an additional gendered impact on women in academic publishing. Results from various studies and analyses suggest that pandemic disproportionately affects women's publishing rates, which, as discussed earlier, are already lower in comparison to men's publishing rates. One explanation is increased childcare responsibilities brought on by quarantining during the pandemic. In addition, many individuals in research simultaneously work as educators. As many institutions shut down during the pandemic, women faculty members, who make up the majority of non-senior positions, had to juggle non-research-related commitments like participation in hiring committees on top of their research activities. Studies demonstrated that this gendered gap in publishing rates was most pronounced in biology, biomedical, and clinical medicine publications. Additional research suggests that the pandemic could also impact women in the early stages of their research careers. In March 2020, women economists had a 12% drop in preprint production and registered reports, with this rate dropping to 20% the following month.

== Pregnancy ==
All around the world women face issues related to pregnancy; before, during and after conception especially in academia. Some issues are dealing with stagnant careers, backlash and scrutiny. Examples of this are women college and university students that become pregnant during their studies. Besides this, women have to face the harsh reality that despite pregnancy being completely natural there may be no resources or facilitations made to accommodate their needs.

In Australia, Dr. Muireann Irish recounted her and her husband's decision to start a family after she was successfully applied for an award by the Australian Research Council. Irish describes thinking this decision would give her three years of the research grant but she understood the strict time frame. While on parental leave, however, her funding was suspended meaning a suspension on data collection and overall a major decision to lay off staff, despite wanting to keep her research going. Irish stated, "There was this consternation about whether I should challenge traditional funding conventions or should I just take the hit [...] Ultimately that's what I ended up doing."

In the United States, while firing or demoting a pregnant woman for reasons relating to her pregnancy is illegal, the laws that pertain to the child's father are relatively unfair, as paid paternity leave is much less than maternity leave. Under the Family and Medical Leave Act, federal law grants fathers, or other secondary caregivers, up to 12 weeks of unpaid leave, but the majority of fathers take 10 days or less leave, if they so decide to take any time off at all. In American workplaces, paternal leave creates a culture that deems men weak or incapable of his duties. This leaves expectant mothers with less support.

Additionally, academic women are often warned by colleagues, peers, and superiors of the risks they face when having children. They are either warned to wait until tenure to have more children or wait until tenure to have any at all. This is common and the same behavior is not reciprocated to men.

A parenthood premium which did not differ by gender was found in Germany and Italy by one 2025 study.

== Scandals ==
In November 2024, English literature researcher Amelia (Ally) Louks sparked social media attention after posting a photo of herself with her defended thesis "Olfactory Ethics: The Politics of Smell in Modern and Contemporary Prose" on X. The tweet caused a strong reaction with over 119.2 million views. The researcher received numerous personal insults. The incident drew attention to the broader issues of online harassment of female academics.

== See also ==
- Gender-equality paradox
- Gender inequality
- Gender pay gap
- Gender role
- Glass ceiling
- Occupational sexism
- Old boy network, or male cronyism
- Publish or perish
- Sex discrimination in education
- Sexism in medicine
- Sexism in the technology industry
- Women in STEM fields
