= Ally Louks =

English academic (born 1997)

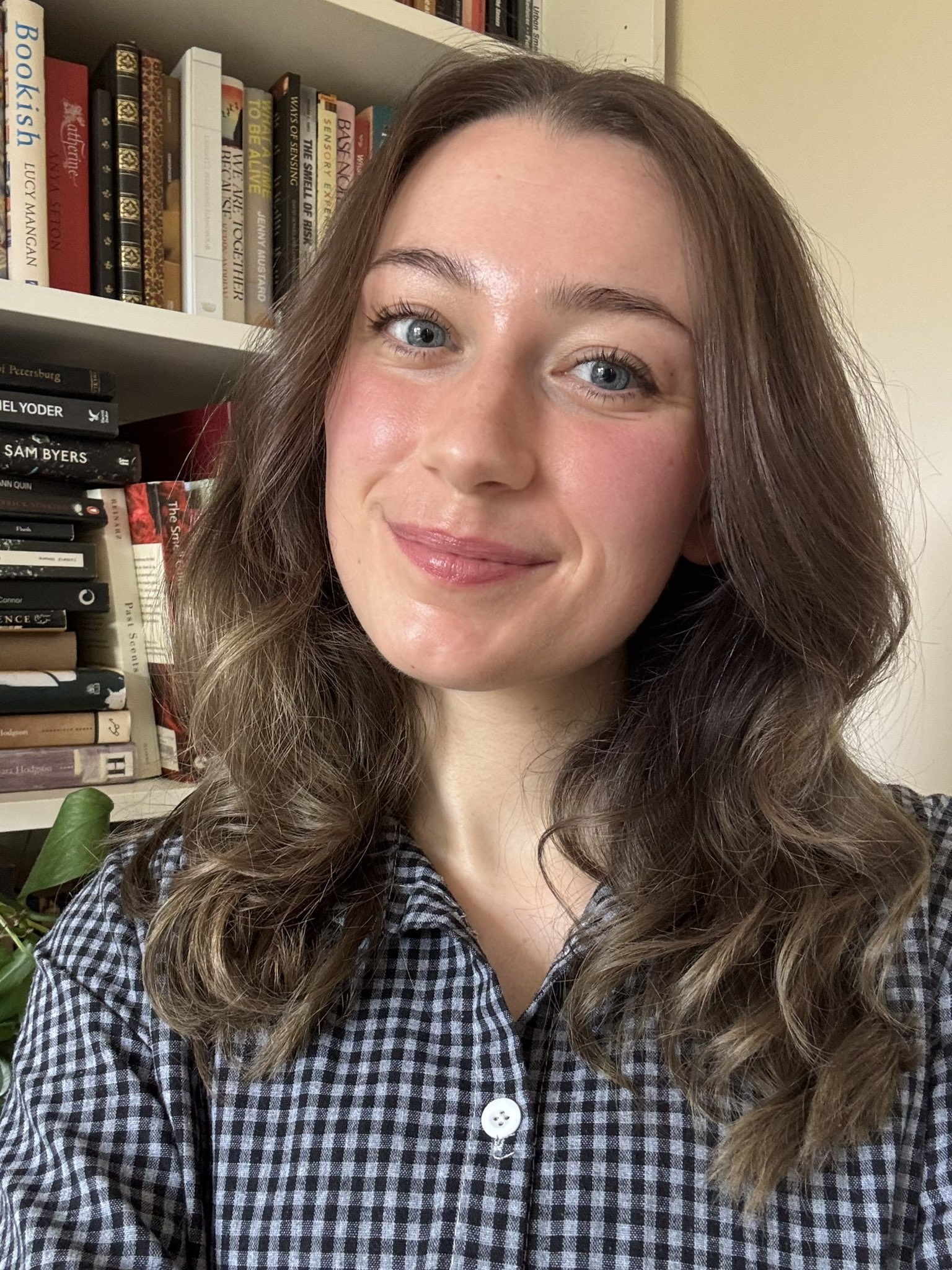
- Louks in 2025
- Born: Amelia Mary Louks; 8 December 1997 (age 28)

Academic background
- Education: University of Exeter (BA); University College London (MA); Peterhouse, Cambridge (PhD)
- Thesis: Olfactory Ethics: The Politics of Smell in Modern and Contemporary Prose (2024)
- Doctoral advisor: Kasia Boddy

Academic work
- Discipline: Literature
- Main interests: Sense of smell in literature

Amelia Mary Louks (/ˈluːks/; born 8 December 1997), known online as Dr Ally Louks, is an English literary academic. She gained prominence after a photograph of her holding her PhD dissertation went viral on social media, bringing attention to the politics of how smell is described and utilised in English literature. Her book Under Your Nose: The Pleasures and Politics of Smell is forthcoming with Penguin.

== Early life and education ==
Amelia Mary Louks was born on 8 December 1997. She graduated with a Bachelor of Arts (BA) in English Literature from the University of Exeter in 2019 and a Master of Arts (MA) in Issues in Modern Society from University College London (UCL) in 2020. The topic of her final undergraduate project was perfume marketing.

On a grant and supervised by Kasia Boddy, Louks completed her PhD at Peterhouse, Cambridge in 2024. Her dissertation was titled Olfactory Ethics: The Politics of Smell in Modern and Contemporary Prose. It examines "morally exigent olfactory language in relation to disgust and desire affects".

When explaining her thesis to the broader audience, she has said: "I draw on the well-documented history of olfactory prejudice in order to examine its contemporary relevance...We tend to think that our desire to avoid bad smells is an instinctual, protective mechanism, but evidence suggests that we are taught which smells to find disgusting, since, the disgust response is almost entirely lacking in children under the age of two. The sense of smell, then, is shaped by society and is influenced by the prejudices that pervade it."

== PhD virality ==
Ally Louks
(@DrAllyLouks)
tweeted:

Thrilled to say I passed my viva with no corrections and am officially PhDone.

27 November 2024

On 27 November 2024, Louks posted a photo of herself on Twitter holding her dissertation, with the caption "Thrilled to say I passed my viva with no corrections and am officially PhDone." Louks's post went viral with over 120 million views. The reception to her post was largely positive, although some attacked her work as worthless or a waste of university resources. It also led to Louks being subjected to personal attacks and sexist trolling. Much of the backlash came from right-wing accounts, often attacking women's place in academia or even the notion of women with careers. She also received rape and death threats, which she reported to police. Louks noted that one of the threats was sent to her personal email, which is not readily available online.

In response to the backlash, Louks wrote while she did not "feel that my work is above criticism....the criticisms levied at me were not based in reality". In an interview with Nil Köksal, she said she had not "taken the vitriol to heart because it's ultimately not really about me or my work". Andy Parker, Master of Louks's constituent college Peterhouse, issued a statement of support for her, as did Cambridge University itself, congratulating her for finishing her PhD with no corrections and stating they believed the backlash was a sign of harassment and misogyny.

The viral post inspired discussions about gender, academia, online abuse, and "misogynistic bullying". Vox called it "a case study in how the online right targets and harasses those who don't fit into the narrow – and often conflicting – standards they've formulated for women." Max La Bouchardiere of Varsity wrote on how this interacts with the neoliberal, anti-intellectual backlash to the humanities and social sciences, which Louks further discussed with Brittany Luse and Jason Stanley on NPR's It's Been a Minute. The journalist Callum Booth wrote that the episode had shown "the worst side of the internet. The part that believes it knows better than experts, that utterly misjudges the point of a post, and the one that resorts to vile insults over discussion."

By December 2024, Louks had gained over 100,000 new Twitter followers. In March 2025, Rolling Stone noted that "Dr. Ally Louks [had] become a beloved fixture of curiosity on an app known for platforming the worst kinds of people".

== Post-doctoral career ==
In February 2025, Louks signed with both a British and an American literary agent. Her book Under Your Nose: The Pleasures and Politics of Smell is forthcoming with Penguin. According to the publisher, "In Under Your Nose, Dr Ally Louks uncovers the hidden influence of smell in our lives. Drawing on science, literature, history and pop culture, she shows how smell is never neutral: it is shaped by culture, and in turn reinforces the biases that shape our world."

== Personal life ==
Louks is vegan. In February 2025, Louks came out as bisexual on Twitter.

== See also ==
- Sexism in academia
