= Kasia Boddy =

British professor and author

- Born: 1966 (age 59–60)

Academic background
- Education: University of Edinburgh; University of Cambridge

Academic work
- Discipline: American Literature
- Sub-discipline: Literary history; cultural history; short stories; Great American Novel
- Institutions: University College London; Fitzwilliam College, Cambridge; Faculty of English, University of Cambridge

Kasia Boddy (born 1966) is a British academic of American literary and cultural history. She is Professor of American Literature at the University of Cambridge and a fellow of Fitzwilliam College.

Boddy was born in Aberdeen in 1966 and grew up in Glasgow, where she attended Hyndland Secondary School. She did an MA in English and Philosophy at Edinburgh and a PhD on American short fiction at Cambridge. She has also taught at the universities of York, Dundee, and University College London.

Her book Boxing: A Cultural History (2008) examines the social, literary and visual history of boxing from antiquity to the modern era, exploring how the sport has been used to symbolize broader struggles relating to race, class, nationalism and masculinity. The book discusses representations of boxing across literature, painting, cinema, photography and popular culture, including works of writers such as Ernest Hemingway and Norman Mailer and artists such as Andy Warhol and Jean-Michel Basquiat.

== Books ==
Boddy is the author of:

- Blooming Flowers: A Seasonal History of Plants and People, Yale University Press, 2020
- Geranium. Reaktion Books, 2012.
- The American Short Story Since 1950, Edinburgh University Press, 2010
- Boxing: A Cultural History, Reaktion Books, 2008.

Her edited volumes include:

- The New Penguin Book of American Short Stories, from Washington Irving to Lydia Davis, Penguin, 2011
- Let's Call the Whole Thing Off: Love Quarrels from Anton Chekhov to ZZ Packer, with Ali Smith and Sarah Wood, Penguin, 2009
- Brilliant Careers: The Virago Book of Twentieth-century Fiction, with Ali Smith and Sarah Wood, Virago Press, 2000
