= Gender-equality paradox =

Concept in psychology and sociology

The Global Gender Gap Index compared to the female share of STEM degrees in different countries

The gender-equality paradox is the counterintuitive finding that various average gender differences in personality and occupational choices are larger in countries that score higher in standard gender equality metrics. Larger differences are found in Big Five personality traits, Dark Triad traits, self-esteem, depression, personal values, occupational and educational choices. These finding are mostly derived from the statistical comparison between standard international measures of gender equality and standard psychological and economic data of gender differences. The most used standard equality indicators such as the Gender Parity Index scores a country higher in equality according to the existence and size of a standard set of female achievement disadvantages such as in leadership or education, with critiques arguing these instruments are flawed due to the absence of measures of real-world gendered treatment, broader women's disadvantages, national specificities, gender stereotypes as well as disadvantages affecting men and other gender groups.

Various explanations for the paradox have been proposed, for example that women in less developed nations are more likely to choose STEM fields based on the increased need for security and good pay. Some scholars instead suggest that gender stereotypes in more gender equal countries are responsible. Some psychologists have asserted that this account merely pushes the question one step back: why do essentialist stereotypes regarding aptitudes (e.g., math ability or interests) appear stronger or more behaviorally influential precisely in societies with the highest gender equality and economic development, rather than weakening as traditional barriers diminish? Some have further argued that the persistence or amplification of such stereotypes may itself reflect deeper innate differences in average interests and preferences that become more freely expressed in low-constraint environments.

The most prominent use of the term is in relation to the disputed claim that increased gender differences in participation in STEM careers arise in countries that have more gender equality, based on a study in Psychological Science by Gijsbert Stoet and David C. Geary, which received substantial coverage in non-academic media outlets. However, separate Harvard researchers were unable to recreate the data reported in the study, and in December 2019, a correction was issued to the original paper. The correction outlined that the authors had created a previously undisclosed and unvalidated method to measure "propensity" of women and men to attain a higher degree in STEM, as opposed to the originally claimed measurement of "women's share of STEM degrees". However, even incorporating the newly disclosed method, the investigating researchers could not recreate all the results presented. A follow-up paper in Psychological Science by the researchers who discovered the discrepancy found conceptual and empirical problems with the gender-equality paradox in STEM hypothesis. Another 2020 study did find evidence of the paradox in the pursuit of mathematical studies; however, they found that "the stereotype associating math to men is stronger in more egalitarian and developed countries" and could "entirely explain the gender-equality paradox". Nonetheless, two reports from the United Nations detected the gender-equality paradox in their studies on women and STEM.

== Gender-equality paradox in STEM ==
Fewer women are noted to major in STEM degrees in university in higher-income countries, with this decrease noted to occur between secondary and tertiary educational standard. In more gender-equal countries, there are greater disparities in degree subject choices.

Less developed countries experiencing growth in education may perceive women in higher education as already nonconforming, so pursuing this route further in what is considered a "masculine" subject may mean little in regards to nonconformity.

=== Stoet and Geary (2018) study ===
This research originally claimed that within the study's sample, more gender equality in a country is linked with a lower proportion of women studying STEM fields. It conducted an analysis of the 2015 results (n=472,242 across 67 nations/regions) of the Programme for International Student Assessment (PISA), focusing on the results of questions based on science aptitude and attitudes. This was contrasted with the level of gender equality as defined by the Global Gender Gap Index (GGGI).

==== Findings ====
The study had a number of primary findings. These can be summarized as follows:

- Girls performed similarly or better than boys in two out of every three countries, and were more capable of STEM tertiary education in nearly all countries examined.
- Science or mathematics is much more likely to be a personal academic strength for boys than for girls.
- More girls entered STEM degrees than graduated.
- The difference between both the performance of girls in PISA was inversely related to the country's GGGI.
- This gap was found to be correlated with the STEM graduation gap, showing that there is a similar gap between the number of girls and boys that enter STEM university programmes compared to those that complete their degrees in more gender-equal countries.

The absolute size of the gap found was not shown to be significant. Rather, it is the relative relationship between the two that was found to show an effect. In other words, no relation was found between the total number of girls who entered and completed STEM degrees and the GGGI of the country. Rather, the effect was between the relative difference in number of girls and boys who entered and completed STEM degrees and the GGGI of their country.

=== Correction to original paper and Richardson et al. (2020) ===
Separate Harvard researchers were unable to recreate the data reported in the study, and after internal review at the journal, a correction was issued to the original paper. The correction outlined that the authors had created a previously undisclosed and unvalidated method to measure "propensity" of women and men to attain a higher degree in STEM, as opposed to the originally claimed measurement of "women's share of STEM degrees". However, even incorporating the newly disclosed method, the investigating researchers could not recreate all the results presented. A follow-up paper by the researchers who discovered the discrepancy found conceptual and empirical problems with the gender-equality paradox in STEM hypothesis.

In February 2020, Stoet and Geary issued a reply, as a commentary in Psychological Science, claiming that, despite their approach, the overall correlation that they had found remained the same, and restated their hypothesis that "men are more likely than women to enter STEM careers because of endogenous interest" and acknowledged that independent studies like Falk and Hermle (2018) confirmed their finding, and expressed that future studies would "help to confirm or reject such a theoretical account."

The United Nations UNESCO report on gender divides in 2019 got similar results to Stoet and Geary and directly acknowledged them by saying "The ICT gender equality paradox, demonstrated here for the first time, bears similarities to a phenomenon that Stoet and Geary (2018) observed in cross-country analysis of gender participation in science, technology, engineering and math (STEM) education programmes." A 2023 study investigated greater economic opportunities as an explanation for the paradox. Two other reports by a United Nations women's expert group in 2022 noted the paradox and cite Stoet and Geary as well.

=== Breda, Jouini, Napp and Thebault (2020) study on economic development and gendered study choices ===
In 2020, a study by Thomas Breda, Elyès Jouini, Clotilde Napp and Georgia Thebault on PISA 2012 data found that the "paradox of gender equality" could be "entirely explained" by the stereotype associating math to men being stronger in more egalitarian and developed countries. They speculate that the phenomenon may be a "product of new forms of social differentiation between women and men" rather than based on "male primacy ideology".

== Personality and preference differences by gender ==
The gender equality paradox has also been used to describe gender differences in personality tests and preferences in more gender equal and wealthier countries, primarily in relation to studies conducted by Falk and Hermle (2018) and by Mac Giolla and Kajonius (2018). Falk and Hermle (2018) used the 2012 Gallup World Poll that explored the preferences of around 80,000 people from 76 countries and found that richer and more gender-equal countries had bigger gender gaps in people's preferences. Mac Giolla and Kajonius (2018) found that women tend to rate higher than men on all five facets of personality on the IPIP‐NEO‐120 personality test and that the gap gets wider in countries that rank higher on the GGGI.

Sex differences have been found to be greater in countries with higher living conditions. One such explaining factor is the resource hypothesis: one can fully express their liking or disliking once basic needs are met, after which sex-specific tastes can grow. In countries with higher living conditions, these tastes can be fully expressed and men and women can pursue what they value, which differ more in these countries.

Studies using large international datasets, such as the IPIP-NEO-120, have reported that women tend to score higher than men on all five major personality domains: "Neuroticism", "Extraversion", "Openness to experience", "Agreeableness", and "Conscientiousness". These differences are more pronounced in gender-egalitarian nations (e.g., those in Scandinavia) compared to less egalitarian ones. A study by Mac Giolla and Kajonius (2019) analyzed data from tens of thousands of participants across dozens of countries and reported a strong positive correlation (r ≈ 0.69) between a country's Gender Equality Index and the magnitude of sex differences in personality. Differences were reported to be roughly twice as large in highly egalitarian countries like Sweden and Norway compared to countries with lower equality scores.

Similar patterns have been reported in subsequent work examining multivariate effect sizes and various personality inventories.

The cultures of STEM fields have been found to be masculine and hostile towards women. However, this does not apply to all STEM fields, as they vary by gender distribution and the extent to which the aforementioned culture applies. Research has found that even when the culture is not overtly hostile, women are less likely to enter that field due to norms and expectations. On the flip side, fields with higher earning potential disproportionately attract males.

== Factors affecting the gender-equality paradox ==
Different factors have been researched and are theorized to affect the gender equality paradox. Richer countries may have more advertising that promotes gender conformity. Previous research demonstrates that in the 1970s when women had more economic power, advertising emphasized female beauty which changed social pressure.

In countries higher-income considered more gender-equal, women being stereotyped as "communal" or caring may have increased, thus creating higher identity-costs for those who pursue STEM careers. Thus, in poorer countries, the marginal utility of money matters more than identity costs, which is reversed in higher-income countries.

Class status is also an actor in upholding gender roles. While higher class-status is associated with more supportive attitudes toward gender-equality, it is also associated with views upholding the social structures of work and family that are less egalitarian. It is noted that higher socioeconomic status couples speak of gender equality, while lower socioeconomic status couples live in a manner that demonstrates gender equality. While lower socioeconomic status couples voice more support for specialized gender roles, their lived social structure incentivizes more egalitarianism.

It is possible that due to personal decisions which may take into consideration advice based on expectancy value theory, people choose to go into fields they believe are their strengths.

== See also ==
- Gender gaps in mathematics and reading
- Health survival paradox
- Sex differences in humans
- Substantive equality
- Perverse incentive
- Unintended consequences
- Women in STEM fields
