= Gender gaps in mathematics and reading =

Child learning phenomenon

The gender gaps in mathematics and reading achievement refer to the finding that, on average, boys and girls perform differently in mathematics and reading skills on tests. On average, boys and men score slightly better in mathematics, although in some countries the gap is reversed, with girls and women scoring higher, and the gender gap has closed in recent years. On the other hand, girls and women score somewhat better in reading skills.

== Mathematics and reading gaps by country ==
The Programme for International Student Assessment assesses the performance of 15-year-olds in mathematics and reading in OECD and OECD partner countries. The table below lists the scores of the PISA 2009 assessment in mathematics and reading by country, as well as the difference between girls and boys. Gaps in bold font mean that the gender gap is statistically significant (p<0.05). A positive mathematics gap means that boys outperform girls, while a negative mathematics gap means that girls outperform boys. A positive reading gap means that girls outperform boys (this is true in every country, so no country has a negative reading gap). There is a negative correlation between the mathematics and reading gender gaps, that is, nations with a larger mathematics gap have a smaller reading gap and vice versa.

| Country | Mathematics score | Mathematics gender gap | Reading score | Reading gender gap |
|---|---|---|---|---|
| Colombia | 382 | **32** | 413 | 10 |
| Costa Rica | 410 | **26** | 442 | 14 |
| Liechtenstein | 535 | **24** | 500 | 32 |
| Belgium | 515 | **22** | 506 | 27 |
| UK | 492 | **21** | 494 | 26 |
| Chile | 420 | **21** | 450 | 22 |
| Austria | 496 | **20** | 470 | 41 |
| Luxembourg | 489 | **20** | 472 | 39 |
| Switzerland | 534 | **20** | 500 | 39 |
| US | 487 | **20** | 500 | 25 |
| Spain | 484 | **19** | 482 | 29 |
| Peru | 365 | **18** | 370 | 22 |
| Netherlands | 526 | **17** | 508 | 25 |
| Venezuela Miranda | 398 | **17** | 421 | 18 |
| Denmark | 503 | **16** | 494 | 29 |
| France | 497 | **16** | 495 | 40 |
| Germany | 512 | **15** | 498 | 40 |
| Italy | 482 | **15** | 487 | 46 |
| Brazil | 386 | **15** | 411 | 28 |
| Greece | 466 | **14** | 482 | 47 |
| HK | 554 | **14** | 534 | 32 |
| Mexico | 418 | **13** | 426 | 25 |
| Canada | 527 | **12** | 524 | 35 |
| Hungary | 490 | **12** | 494 | 38 |
| Portugal | 487 | **12** | 489 | 38 |
| Tunisia | 372 | **12** | 402 | 31 |
| Uruguay | 427 | **12** | 424 | 41 |
| Montenegro | 402 | **12** | 408 | 52 |
| Argentina | 388 | **11** | 397 | 36 |
| Turkey | 446 | **11** | 464 | 43 |
| Macao | 526 | **11** | 487 | 34 |
| Serbia | 442 | **11** | 442 | 40 |
| Croatia | 460 | **11** | 478 | 51 |
| Australia | 514 | **10** | 514 | 37 |
| Japan | 529 | 10 | 520 | 39 |
| Ireland | 487 | 8 | 496 | 39 |
| New Zealand | 519 | 8 | 522 | 45 |
| Israel | 447 | 8 | 474 | 43 |
| Azerbaijan | 431 | **8** | 362 | 24 |
| Estonia | 512 | **8** | 502 | 44 |
| Singapore | 562 | **6** | 526 | 31 |
| Czech Republic | 492 | 5 | 480 | 48 |
| Norway | 498 | 5 | 504 | 47 |
| Chinese Taipei | 544 | 5 | 496 | 37 |
| Panama | 360 | 5 | 370 | 33 |
| Korea | 546 | 4 | 540 | 35 |
| Poland | 495 | 4 | 500 | 49 |
| Romania | 427 | 4 | 424 | 42 |
| Thailand | 419 | 4 | 419 | 38 |
| Mauritius | 420 | 4 | 406 | 40 |
| Finland | 540 | 3 | 536 | 55 |
| Iceland | 506 | 3 | 500 | 44 |
| Slovakia | 496 | 3 | 478 | 51 |
| Moldova | 398 | 3 | 388 | 45 |
| Latvia | 482 | 2 | 484 | 47 |
| Russia | 468 | 2 | 460 | 45 |
| Slovenia | 502 | 1 | 484 | 55 |
| Kazakhstan | 405 | 0 | 390 | 43 |
| Indonesia | 372 | -1 | 402 | 37 |
| Jordan | 386 | -1 | 406 | 57 |
| Sweden | 494 | -2 | 498 | 46 |
| China Shanghai | 600 | -2 | 556 | 40 |
| Georgia | 380 | -3 | 374 | 61 |
| Malaysia | 404 | -3 | 414 | 35 |
| Bulgaria | 428 | -4 | 430 | 61 |
| Qatar | 368 | **-5** | 372 | 50 |
| Kyrgyzstan | 331 | **-6** | 314 | 53 |
| Lithuania | 477 | **-6** | 468 | 59 |
| United Arab Emirates | 421 | **-6** | 431 | 58 |
| India Tamil Nadu | 350 | -7 | 335 | 36 |
| Trinidad and Tobago | 414 | **-8** | 416 | 58 |
| Albania | 378 | **-11** | 386 | 62 |
| Malta | 462 | **-15** | 442 | 72 |

== See also ==
- Gender-equality paradox
