= Sex differences in education in the United States =

Sex differences in education in the United States refers to the specific issues, such as gender-based discrimination related to coursework and use of disciplinary action, that American students of all genders encounter. Furthermore, while sex differences in education explains the prevalence of gender-based differences in education on a global scale, the American education system includes specific forms of gender discrimination dissimilar to other countries.

== Statistics ==
Girls and boys have very different developmental trajectories. It has been found that boys are the most likely to delay entry into kindergarten (60% of the children are boys), meaning they do not attend until they are at least 6 years old. Boys are also more likely than girls to repeat a grade or more during their time in elementary school (66% of children who repeat kindergarten are boys). On average, girls perform significantly better in school and earn better grades. But, girls and boys do have different strengths. On average, girls perform better in writing and boys are ahead of girls in mathematics.

Men and women workers in the United States have the same mean numbers of years of education which is 12.2 years. But there are some discrepancies across gender when it comes to education. When it comes to terminating an educational career, men are more likely to terminate their education either before achieving a high school diploma or at the college level (5,779), whereas women are more likely to terminate their education after having achieved a high school diploma. When it comes to amount of education, working class girls tended to have the shortest academic career. Middle-class boys have the longest academic careers. The sex gap for education was wider between the working class children and the middle class children. Girls had a wider gap when it came to the class gap then boys.

== The American School System and Male Students ==
Male students, like their female counterparts, experience discrimination in academic settings. Several scholars argue this discrimination focuses on teachers' discipline of their male students as well as on the attitudes of other male peers. Educational scholars and other sociologists use these claims to support their theories regarding male enrollment in specific academic subjects.

Dan Kindlon and Michael Thompson examine the ways in which boys' earlier experiences with education impact their later relationships with schooling. For example, they write of a male patient whose struggles in middle school were traced back to his history of disciplinary violations. The authors go on to state that boys' typical behaviors—such as their propensity for physical action—are a "problem" when they enter American schools, institutions that prioritize obedience and self-control. Furthermore, Kindlon and Thompson explain the detriment of stereotypes surrounding boys, explaining how teachers often ascribe their own biases to male students.

Authors like Myra Sadker and David Sadker provide a history to the argument that schools are "feminine" spaces—a critique these authors challenge. In this overview, they explain how women's entrance into the teaching profession at the time of the Civil War eventually enabled women to lead the field. This large number of female teachers in American schools thus created a fear among men that boys would learn (and perform) traits that were socially coded as feminine. Shifting from this history, Sadker and Sadker write how heteronormative standards, which American schools reinforce through activities, such as sports, affect boys' ideas of themselves and their female peers.

DiPrete and Buchmann synthesize other scholars' work concerning conceptions of "masculinity" and its influence on male performance in American high schools. They use examples, such as survey data and student interviews, to highlight the fact that peer groups may be partially responsible for explaining male patterns of achievement. For example, they highlight research that suggests male students "gender" good academic performance.

While studies have demonstrated the disparities between male and female students in STEM, a study by the American Association of University Women shows the unequal distribution of male students in subjects like English and the Arts. Notably, male students enroll in "remedial" English classes more often than their female counterparts. The authors posit that educators in these fields (especially in literature) may use learning techniques that girls prefer. This disparity between male-female enrollments in literature classes may also reflect the gendered ideas of students, as students enroll in classes most in line with their expressed gender identity.

== STEM Education ==
Males largely outnumber females in science, technology, engineering, and mathematics related careers, which are commonly referred to as STEM. This disparity can be attributed to a multitude of causes. The belief in stereotypes, lack of science self-confidence, and dissatisfaction with the way science education is presented are the primary issues preventing women from becoming more involved in STEM fields.

This scarcity of women is often compared to a leaky pipeline. As children, both boys and girls express equal amounts of interest in science, but as they age the girls slowly drop the subject in favor of more traditionally female fields. While this theory satisfactorily illustrates the changes at a younger age, the number of women in STEM fields does not change drastically once they enter college. Therefore, the issue is one of interest much earlier on.

Throughout high school, the percentage of males interested in STEM careers changed from 39.5 to 39.7, effectively staying constant. Contrastingly, the percentage of females interested changed from 15.7 to 12.7. Not only are the initial interest levels over twice as low for females, they also drop by nearly 20%. This data suggests, then, that the differences between male and female interest in STEM subjects is developed from an early age and exacerbated through education. Many school systems present students with multiple paths of science education. If students have had negative experience with science, they are more likely to choose a path with fewer requirements. When female students reach the age where they begin to feel ostracized by their peers for a passion for science, they have an easy option to transition out of the field completely.

Many studies have been performed with the intention of determining social effects on girls in STEM. In one sample, the girls had higher science grades than the boys. Nonetheless, they maintained equal self-confidence and reported higher levels of anxiety and stress because of the class. Many capable young women may be opting out of STEM fields because they feel inferior to their male classmates.

Closing the gap between genders in STEM is vital for both women and the success of the fields themselves. The way to do this is through education. In February 2017 legislation such as "The Next Space Pioneers, Innovators, Researchers, and Explorers Women's Act" and "The Promoting Women in Entrepreneur Act" was passed with the intention of encouraging more women and girls to study science, technology, engineering, and mathematics. Colleges across the country are implementing outreach programs designed to mentor and recruit female STEM students. One such example is IWITTS' CalWomenTech Project, which increased the City College of San Francisco's Computer Networking and Information Technology (CNIT) program's female enrollment from 18.1% to 30.1%.

== The Gender Gap of Attitudes Towards Education ==
Girls have often received higher grades than boys. Thomas A. DiPrete and Claudia Bachmann say one of the three main reasons for this is because girls show higher levels of attachment to school leading to a deeper sense of gratification when receiving these good grades. Students encourage school involvement if it is paired with the suitable behaviors of being popular, athletic, or participating in extracurricular activities according to Thomas A. DiPrete and Claudia Buchmann. However, girls express stronger connections to their education than boys. 90 percent of eighth grade males responded that good grades are important. 50 percent said that good grades are very important. Girls' value of their academic success was shown as closer to the perceived value of their parents than boys. 95 percent of girls reported that good grades are important to them, and 62 percent declared that good grades are very important. This gender gap continues even when the sample is shortened to just the high achieving boys and girls. This is portrayed by the 2 percent of girls that received A's answering that grades are only somewhat important, contrasting the 6 percent of exceeding boys who would agree.

65 percent of eighth grade males see themselves earning at least a bachelor's degree. Girls' educational aspirations are even higher. 75 percent of girls expect to get a bachelor's degree, and 42 percent of girls expect to get a master's or doctorate. The gender gap is massive at the doctoral level, seeing how this is nearly 50 percent more than for boys. Thomas A. DiPrete and Claudia Buchmann made the conclusion that since girls typically receive higher marks than boys, and children have a basic understanding that higher grades can lead to higher educational success, that it is reasonable for girls to have aspirations that surpass the boys. Thomas A. DiPrete and Claudia Bachmann said these students' attachment to school could help one to understand their value of their marks and education. Students who are only drawn to school because of an understanding that it is essential for a high salary career can be said to have an "instrumental attachment". They understand school to be an "instrument" that they use to achieve their goal. In contrast, students may have school attachment because they are invested emotionally and receive a great sentiment of success from it, especially when obtaining positive regard from teachers. Students had answered questions relating to whether they felt attached to their school and teachers. Boys did not show as much amount of attachment to school as girls did.

All in all, girls express more support than boys for immediate academic success and long-term scholastic goals . Girls' inspiration for long-term educational success could also be contributed by a higher satisfaction of school and the instant fulfilment they get from a great performance. Thomas A. DiPrete and Claudia Bachmann believe these two forces could be working in unison with each other.

== Consequences of inequality in education ==
Sex discrimination in education persists beyond graduation, influencing one's process of entering the workforce. Networking trends, gender norms, and the perception of parenthood differ based on one's gender. A study done by Lindsey Trimble was conducted to understand how gender influences job networking. Through extensive research, the results shed light on a host of variances in both the execution of networking and its success levels between men and women. Firstly, people are more likely to find a job through same-gender contacts (about 65%), most of which are found through social functions that are already segregated by sex. Gender norms influence this networking process as well. Certain jobs are commonly perceived as only being fit for one gender. For example, only 9% of nurses are male, while only 4% of women work in local sheriff departments. Furthermore, women only make up 4% of CEO positions at S&P 500 companies. Thus, if people are finding jobs through same-gender contacts, these contacts are most likely in gender-segregated positions themselves, perpetuating gender inequality within the job selection process. These gender norms influence how decisions are made regarding whom to network for and whom to hire. People are more likely to help someone out if they think they're fit for the particular job. Gender is often considered to be one of the many indicators of an individual's level of capability. This could lead a contact to assist a man over a woman for careers considered more masculine. Employers decision-making process is influenced by gender stereotypes as well. For example, assertiveness is often considered to be a sign of strength or good leadership in a man, yet, on the contrary, can cause others to think a woman is too opinionated or bossy. Additionally, parenthood affects one's chance of being hired differently based on one's gender. Fatherhood is associated with a greater chance of getting a promotion, while motherhood decreases promotion rates, especially if the children are younger. Statistically, women experience internal promotion rates that are 34–46% lower than for men. Another aspect of parenthood that creates workforce discrimination is the presence of a societal pressure put on women to stay at home with their children. Not only could this make employers less inclined to hire a woman for time-consuming jobs, but it leaves a stigma on mothers who chose to work full-time, something men don't experience. Workforce discrimination is the result of a very complex list of causes, including gender norms and stereotypes, networking patterns, and the perception of parenthood. By better understanding these concepts, one can begin to combat them and create more gender equality.
