= David C. Geary =

American cognitive and evolutionary psychologist (born 1957)

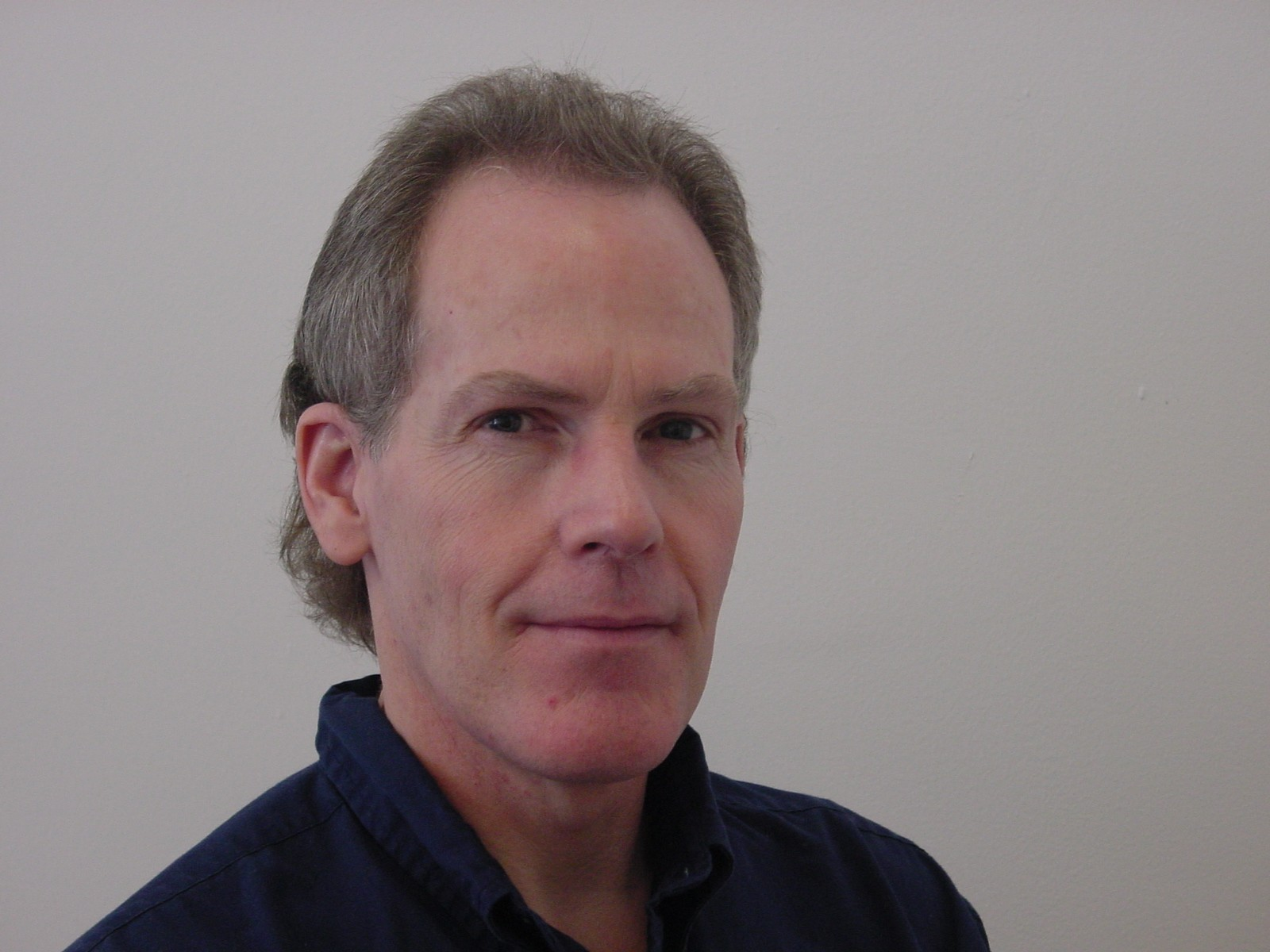
David C. Geary

David Cyril Geary (born June 7, 1957) is an American cognitive developmental and evolutionary psychologist with interests in mathematical learning and sex differences. He is currently a Curators' Professor and Thomas Jefferson Fellow in the Department of Psychological Sciences and Interdisciplinary Neuroscience Program at the University of Missouri in Columbia.

== Education ==
Geary received a BS degree in psychology from Santa Clara University (California) in 1979, and an MS from the clinical child/school psychology program at California State University at Hayward (now East Bay) in 1981. After completing the MS degree, he worked for the emergency treatment center of the Mental Research Institute in Palo Alto, California, and began the Ph.D. program at the University of California, Riverside, in 1982. His initial interests were in hemispheric laterality and associated sex differences, but focused his dissertation work on mathematical cognition under the direction of Keith Widaman (now at UC, Davis).

== Career ==
After completing his Ph.D. in developmental psychology in 1986, Geary took a one-year position at the University of Texas at El Paso and then moved to the University of Missouri, first at the Rolla campus (1987–1989) and then in Columbia. During this time, he served as chair of the Department of Psychological Sciences (2002–2005) and contributed heavily to the creation of the Ph.D. program in developmental psychology.

== Research ==
Geary's wide-ranging interests are reflected in invited addresses in a variety of departments (anthropology, biology, behavior genetics, computer science, education, government, mathematics, neuroscience, physics, and psychology) and Universities throughout the United States, as well as in Canada, Europe, and East Asia.

Geary's research on mathematics learning, evolutionary psychology, and sex differences has been featured in many popular press outlets, including Discover, Education Week, Forbes, CBS News, and MSNBC among many others.

Geary's research on children's mathematical development resulted in a MERIT award from the National Institutes of Health (NIH). In 2005, the University of Missouri awarded Geary a Curators’ Professorship, and the Thomas Jefferson Professorship in 2009. Among other distinctions, he is 2009 co-recipient of the George A. Miller Award for an Outstanding Recent Article on General Psychology for the 2007 Psychological Science in the Public Interest monograph on sex differences in mathematics and science, co-authored with Halpern, Benbow, Gur, Hyde, and Gernsbacher. He is a fellow of the Association for Psychological Science (2005) and the American Association for the Advancement of Science (2011).

Geary's research interests are centered on his four books, Children's mathematical development (1994), Male, female (1998, 2010, second edition), Origin of mind (2005), and Evolution of vulnerability (2015); the latter was discussed in an interview with the Guardian. He is also co-author of the 2008 Sex differences: Summarizing more than a century of scientific research, and co-editor with Drs. Berch and Mann Koepke of a five-volume series on mathematical cognition and learning.

His research on mathematical development ranged from mathematical modeling of adults’ processing of arithmetic problems; the effects of aging on these processes; and cross national and cross generational differences in mathematical abilities. In this area, he is best known for his research on learning difficulties in mathematics and in 1993 published a theoretical and review article that outlined subtypes of disabilities and helped to organize subsequent research in this area. He currently directs the Missouri Longitudinal Study of Mathematical Learning and Disability.

Geary's research in evolutionary psychology also ranges across a variety of issues, from evolution of the hominid brain to men's hormonal responses while competing against members of their in-group or against an out-group. He has also written extensively on human paternal investment (fatherhood) and the evolution of the human family, and is one of the pioneers in evolutionary developmental psychology and evolutionary educational psychology.

His collaborators include former students, Drew H. Bailey and Benjamin Winegard with research focused in social signaling, among other topics.

== Public service ==
Geary contributed to the 1998 Mathematics Framework for California Public Schools and in 2006 was appointed to the President's National Mathematics Advisory Panel. While serving on the panel, he chaired the learning processes task group. In 2007, he was appointed by President George W. Bush to the National Board of Directors, Institute of Education Sciences (IES), and served through 2010. He is also co-author of Developing effective fractions instruction for kindergarten through 8th grade: A practice guide and an on-line overview of learning disabilities in mathematics for parents and teachers.

== Personal life ==
Geary is married to Yin Xia, an applied economist. He also has a son named Mick Licken.

== Selected works ==
Geary has authored or co-authored and published over 200 articles in academic journals. His h-index according to Google Scholar is 54.

=== Books ===
- Geary, David (2015). Evolution of Vulnerability: Implications for Sex Differences in Health and Development. Amsterdam: Academic Press. ISBN 978-0-12-801562-9.
- Geary, David (2010). Male, Female: The Evolution of Human Sex Differences. Washington, DC: American Psychological Association. ISBN 978-1-4338-0682-7.
- Geary, David (2005). Origin of Mind: Evolution of Brain, Cognition, and General Intelligence. Washington, DC: American Psychological Association. ISBN 978-1-59147-181-3.
- Geary, David (1994). Children's Mathematical Development: Research and Practical Applications. Washington, DC: American Psychological Association. ISBN 978-1-55798-258-2.

=== Others ===
- Geary, David C. (2006). "Evolutionary developmental psychology: Current status and future directions" (PDF). Developmental Review. 26 (2): 113–119. doi:10.1016/j.dr.2006.02.005. Archived from the original (PDF) on 2016-03-03.
- Geary, D. C. (2005). Folk knowledge and academic learning. In B. J. Ellis & D. F. Bjorklund (Eds.), Origins of the social mind. (pp. 493–519). New York: Guilford Publications. Full text
- Geary, D. C. (2004). Evolution and cognitive development. In R. Burgess & K. MacDonald (Eds.), Evolutionary perspectives on human development (pp. 99–133). Thousand Oaks, CA: Sage Publications. Full text
- Geary, D. C.; Byrd-Craven, J.; Hoard, M. K.; Vigil, J.; Numtee, C. (2003). "Evolution and development of boys' social behavior" (PDF). Developmental Review. 23 (4): 444–470. doi:10.1016/j.dr.2003.08.001. Archived from the original (PDF) on 2006-08-31.
- Geary, D.C.; Bjorklund, D.F. (2000). "Evolutionary Developmental Psychology". Child Development. 71 (1): 57–65. CiteSeerX 10.1.1.380.309. doi:10.1111/1467-8624.00118. PMID 10836558.
