= Androgyny =

Having both male and female characteristics

Androgyny is the possession of both masculine and feminine characteristics.

When androgyny refers to mixed biological sex characteristics in humans, it often refers to conditions in which characteristics of both sexes are expressed in a single individual. These are known as intersex people, or those who are born with congenital variations that complicate assigning their sex at birth, as they do not correspond entirely to the male or female sexes. Both intersex and non-intersex people can exhibit a mixture of male and female sex traits such as hormone levels, type of internal and external genitalia, and the appearance of secondary sex characteristics.

On the other hand, when androgyny is used to refer to physical traits, it often refers to a person whose biological sex may be ambiguous at a glance because of their mixture of male and female characteristics. Because androgyny encompasses additional meanings related to gender identity and gender expression that are distinct from biological sex, today the word androgynous is rarely used to formally describe mixed biological sex characteristics in humans.

== Etymology ==
The term derives from Ancient Greek: ἀνδρόγυνος, from ἀνήρ, stem ἀνδρ- (anér, andro-, meaning man) and γυνή (gunē, gyné, meaning woman) through the Latin: androgynus.

== History ==
Androgyny is attested from earliest history and across world cultures. In ancient Sumer, androgynous men were heavily involved in the cult of Inanna. A set of priests known as gala worked in Inanna's temples, where they performed elegies and lamentations. Gala took female names, spoke in the eme-sal dialect, which was traditionally reserved for women, and appear to have engaged in sexual acts with men.

In later Mesopotamian cultures, kurgarrū and assinnu were servants of the goddess Ishtar, Inanna's East Semitic equivalent, who dressed in female clothing and performed war dances in Ishtar's temples. Several Akkadian proverbs seem to suggest that they may have also engaged in sexual activity with men. Gwendolyn Leick, an anthropologist known for her writings on Mesopotamia, has compared these individuals to the contemporary Indian hijra. In one Akkadian hymn, Ishtar is described as transforming men into women.

The ancient Greek myth of Hermaphroditus and Salmacis, two divinities who fused into a single immortal, provided a frame of reference used in Western culture for centuries. Androgyny and homosexuality are also seen in Plato's Symposium, in a myth where, according to Aristophanes, humanity started as three sexes: male-male people that descended from the sun, female-female people who descended from Earth, and male-female people who came from the Moon. The androgynous humans were spherical and had four legs, four hands and two heads. They were also extremely powerful and dared rebel against the Greek pantheon. "Plato cites the ancient tale of Otus and Ephialtes who rebelled against the gods and drove them from Mount Olympus. Not satisfied with this, they tried to set Mount Ossa atop Mount Olympus, and Mount Pelion atop of Ossa, that they might attack the gods in heaven itself."

The gods, angered, divided the primordial humans in two and scattered them across the Earth. The divided searched for their other halves. The women who sought another woman and the men who sought another man were homosexuals.

The Mishnah, a foundational text of Rabbinic Judaism from 2nd century Syria Palaestina, uses the term androgynos 32 times. It also recounts the creation of humanity in the Genesis creation narrative in Platonic terms. Genesis Rabbah, a midrashic text written some time after the Mishnah, explains, "Adam, who was created alone and thus embodies all of mankind, was androgynous, i.e. a bi-sexual being, male and female bound together in a single male-female body: 'He created him androgynous . . . He created him double-faced.'" It is one of four additional legal categories of transgressively sexed individuals in the text, alongside the ayelonit, tumtum, and saris. In one mention, Rabbi Meir describes the androgynos as "a creation of its own type, which the sages could not decide whether is male or female".

Philosophers such as Philo of Alexandria, and early Christian leaders such as Origen and Gregory of Nyssa, continued to promote the idea of androgyny as humans' original and perfect state during late antiquity." In medieval Europe, the concept of androgyny played an essential role in both Christian theological debate and alchemical theory. Influential theologians such as John of Damascus and John Scotus Eriugena continued to promote the pre-fall androgyny proposed by the early Church Fathers, Other clergy expounded and debated the proper view and treatment of contemporary hermaphrodites.

Aristophanes' and Plato's conception are found in theosophy of Neoplatonism and Neo-Pythagoreanism, and Gnosticism. In particular, it was important to Islamic and Jewish philosophy, Kabbalah, and alchemy through the Renaissance and Romanticism.

The figure of the Androgyne as an archaic formulation of the coexistence of all attributes, thus including sexual attributes, in the divine unity and perfect man of origins according to Mircea Eliade depicts the coincidentia oppositorum or unity of opposites: in a variety of creation myths, the unique androgynous being appears before the separation of things.

=== Modern history ===
Western esotericism's embrace of androgyny continued into the modern era. A 1550 anthology of alchemical thought, De Alchemia, included the influential Rosary of the Philosophers, which depicts the sacred marriage of the masculine principle (Sol) with the feminine principle (Luna), producing the "Divine Androgyne," a representation of alchemical Hermetic beliefs in dualism, transformation, and the transcendental perfection of the union of opposites.

The symbolism and meaning of androgyny was a central preoccupation of the German mystic Jakob Böhme and the Swedish philosopher Emanuel Swedenborg. The philosophical concept of the "Universal Androgyne" (or "Universal Hermaphrodite") – a perfect merging of the sexes that predated the current corrupted world or was the utopia of the next – is also important in some strains of Rosicrucianism and in philosophical traditions such as Swedenborgianism and Theosophy. Twentieth century architect Claude Fayette Bragdon expressed the concept mathematically as a magic square, using it as building block in many of his most noted buildings.

In the mid-18th century, the macaronis of the Georgian era of England were a wealthy subculture of young men, known for androgynous gender expression. Their unusually large wigs, lavish fashion, and sentimental behavior prompted backlash from conservative generations of the time. In 1770, the Oxford Dictionary declared, "There is indeed a kind of animal, neither male nor female, a thing of the neuter gender, lately started up among us. It is called a macaroni." An example is portrait artist Richard Cosway, referred to as "the Macaroni artist."

== Psychological ==
In psychological study, various measures have been used to characterize gender, such as the Bem Sex Role Inventory and the Personal Attributes Questionnaire.

Masculine traits are categorized as agentic and instrumental, dealing with assertiveness and analytical skill. Feminine traits are categorized as communal and expressive, dealing with empathy and subjectivity. Androgynous individuals exhibit behavior that extends beyond what is normally associated with their given sex. Due to the possession of both masculine and feminine characteristics, androgynous individuals have access to a wider array of psychological competencies in regards to emotional regulation, communication styles, and situational adaptability. Androgynous individuals have also been associated with higher levels of creativity and mental health.

=== Bem Sex-Role Inventory ===
The Bem Sex-Role Inventory (BSRI) was constructed by the early leading proponent of androgyny, Sandra Bem (1977). The BSRI is one of the most widely used gender measures. Based on an individual's responses to the items in the BSRI, they are classified as having one of four gender role orientations: masculine, feminine, androgynous, or undifferentiated. Bem understood that both masculine and feminine characteristics could be expressed by anyone and it would determine those gender role orientations.

An androgynous person is an individual who has a high degree of both feminine (expressive) and masculine (instrumental) traits. A feminine individual is ranked high on feminine (expressive) traits and ranked low on masculine (instrumental) traits. A masculine individual is ranked high on instrumental traits and ranked low on expressive traits. An undifferentiated person is low on both feminine and masculine traits.

According to Sandra Bem, androgynous individuals are more flexible and more mentally healthy than either masculine or feminine individuals; undifferentiated individuals are less competent. More recent research has debunked this idea, at least to some extent, and Bem herself has found weaknesses in her original pioneering work. She preferred to work with gender schema theory.

One study found that masculine and androgynous individuals had higher expectations for being able to control the outcomes of their academic efforts than feminine or undifferentiated individuals.

=== Facial impressions ===
In 2021, Neil Hester, Eric Hehman, and Benedict C. Jones tested feminine-masculine facial perceptions as a single bipolar dimension A single bipolar dimension within gender impression would mean that if one has more feminine facial features, they will be perceived as less masculine, and vice versa. They found that these measures of facial impressions were oversimplified, and that perceived femininity and masculinity contribute to a variety of social judgements - individuals' faces can have high femininity and masculinity, in which some features were successfully used to predict impressions of trust, dominance, threat, and attractiveness.

=== 21st Century Neo-Androgyny ===
The 21st Century Neo-Androgyny model was developed in 2022 by Bobbi M. Woodhill and Curtis A. Samuels. The model detailed a novel, de-gendered theory of androgyny within psychology and offered it as a replacement for flawed or outdated theories and models. Woodhill and Samuels used the factors of social efficacy, creativity, capability, eminence, and determination to detach emotional traits from gender, and state that these five factors can be used in the expression of traits, goals, interests, occupational skills, and hobbies. The literature from Woodhill and Samuels also mentioned the Bem Sex Role Theory, and stated that even though the 1970 theory built a robust theoretical foundation for the study of gender and androgyny, it lacked significant cultural nuance and flexibility, and is now outdated.

=== Personal Attributes Questionnaire ===
The Personal Attributes Questionnaire (PAQ) was developed in the 70s by Janet Spence, Robert Helmreich, and Joy Stapp. This test asked subjects to complete a survey consisting of three sets of scales relating to masculinity, femininity, and masculinity-femininity. These scales had sets of adjectives commonly associated with males, females, and both. These descriptors were chosen based on typical characteristics as rated by a population of undergrad students. Similar to the BSRI, the PAQ labeled androgynous individuals as people who ranked highly in both the areas of masculinity and femininity. However, Spence and Helmreich considered androgyny to be a descriptor of high levels of masculinity and femininity as opposed to a category in and of itself.

== Biological sex ==
Historically, the word androgynous was applied to humans with a mixture of male and female sex characteristics, and was sometimes used synonymously with the term hermaphrodite, though the term is now considered highly offensive. In some disciplines, such as botany, androgynous and hermaphroditic are still used interchangeably.

When androgyny is used to refer to physical traits, it often refers to a person whose biological sex is difficult to discern at a glance because of their mixture of male and female characteristics. Because androgyny encompasses additional meanings related to gender identity and gender expression that are distinct from biological sex, today the word androgynous is rarely used to formally describe mixed biological sex characteristics in humans. In modern English, the word intersex is used to more precisely describe individuals with mixed or ambiguous sex characteristics. However, both intersex and non-intersex people can exhibit a mixture of male and female sex traits such as hormone levels, type of internal and external genitalia, and the appearance of secondary sex characteristics.

== Gender identity ==
An individual's gender identity, a personal sense of one's own gender, may be described as androgynous if they feel that they have both masculine and feminine aspects. The word androgyne can refer to a person who does not fit neatly into one of the typical masculine or feminine gender roles of their society, or to a person whose gender is a mixture of male and female, not necessarily half-and-half. Many androgynous individuals identify as being mentally or emotionally both masculine and feminine. They may also identify as "gender-neutral", "genderqueer", or "non-binary". A person who is androgynous may engage freely in what is seen as masculine or feminine behaviors as well as tasks. They may have a balanced identity that includes the virtues of both men and women and may disassociate the task with what gender they may be socially or physically assigned to. People who identify as androgynous typically disregard which traits are culturally constructed specifically for males and females within a society, and rather focus on what behavior is most effective within the situational circumstance.

Some non-Western cultures recognize additional androgynous gender identities, called third genders.

== Gender expression ==
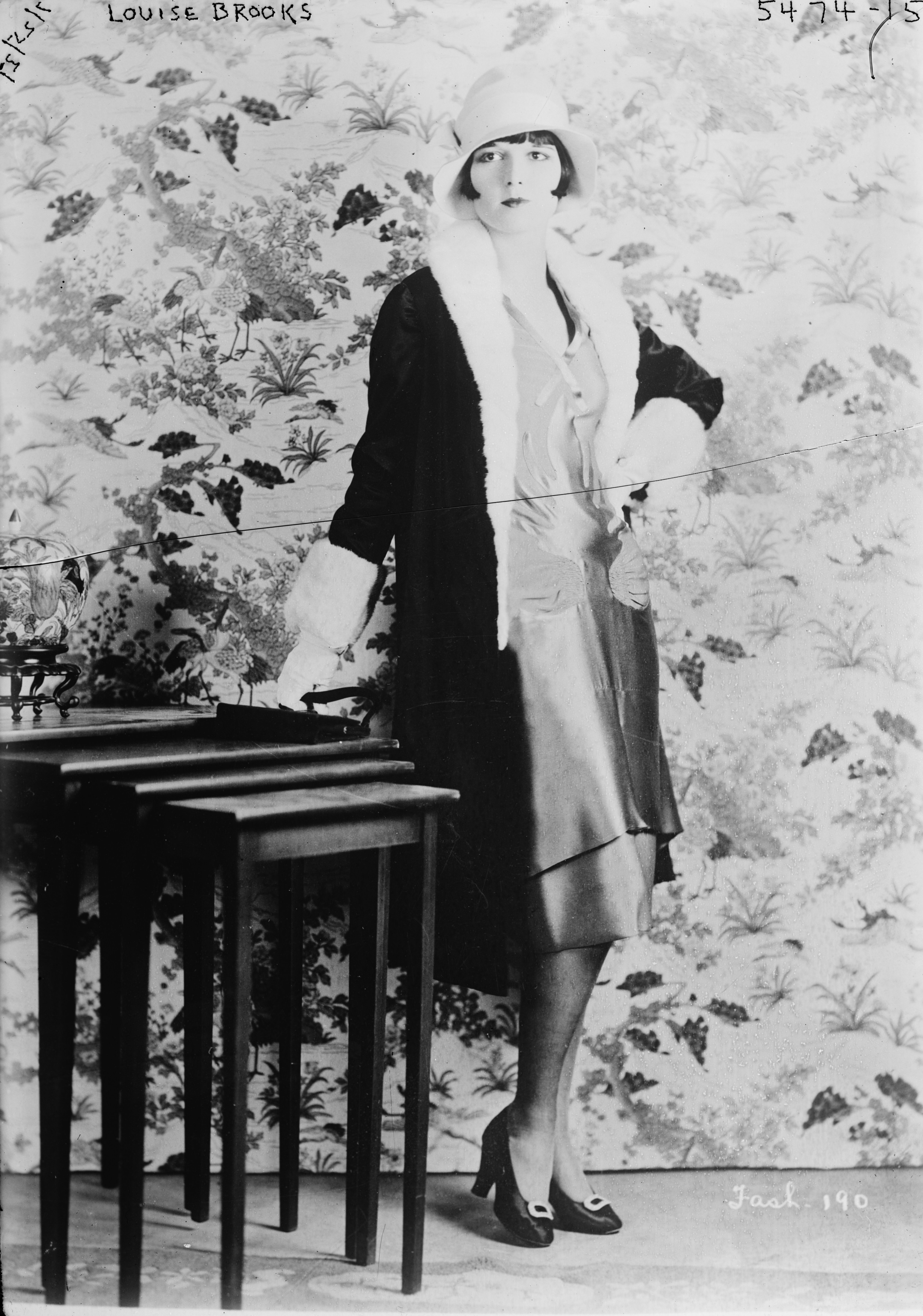
Louise Brooks exemplified the flapper. Flappers challenged traditional gender roles and had boyish hair cuts and androgynous figures.

Gender expression that includes a mixture of masculine and feminine characteristics can be described as androgynous. The categories of masculine and feminine in gender expression are socially constructed, and rely on shared conceptions of clothing, behavior, communication style, and other aspects of presentation. In some cultures, androgynous gender expression has been celebrated, while in others, androgynous expression has been limited or suppressed. To say that a culture or relationship is androgynous is to say that it lacks rigid gender roles, or has blurred lines between gender roles.

The word genderqueer is often used by androgynous individuals to refer to themselves, but the terms genderqueer and androgynous are neither equivalent nor interchangeable. Genderqueer, by virtue of its ties with queer culture, carries sociopolitical connotations that androgyny does not carry. For the association with homosexuality, some androgynes may find the label genderqueer inaccurate, inapplicable, or offensive. Androgyneity is considered by some to be a viable alternative to androgyn for differentiating internal (psychological) factors from external (visual) factors.

An alternative to androgyny is gender-role transcendence: the view that individual competence should be conceptualized on a personal basis rather than on the basis of masculinity, femininity, or androgyny.

In agenderism, the division of people into women and men (in the physical sense), is considered erroneous and artificial. Agendered individuals are those who reject gender labeling in conception of self-identity and other matters. They see their subjectivity through the term person instead of woman or man. According to E. O. Wright, genderless people can have traits, behaviors and dispositions that correspond to what is currently viewed as feminine and masculine, and the mix of these would vary across persons. Nevertheless, it does not suggest that everyone would be androgynous in their identities and practices in the absence of gendered relations. What disappears in the idea of genderlessness is any expectation that some characteristics and dispositions are strictly attributed to a person of any biological sex.

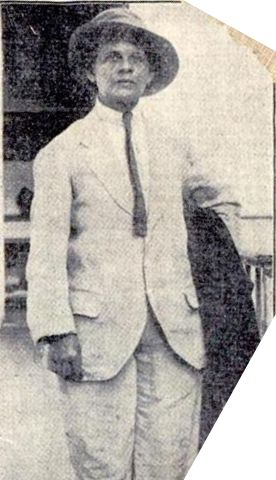
Labor leader Luisa Capetillo wearing men's clothing

== Contemporary trends ==
Throughout most of twentieth century Western history, social rules have restricted people's dress according to gender. Trousers were traditionally a male form of dress, frowned upon for women. However, during the 19th century, female spies were introduced and Vivandières wore a certain uniform with a dress over trousers. Women activists during that time would also decide to wear trousers, for example Luisa Capetillo, a women's rights activist and the first woman in Puerto Rico to wear trousers in public.

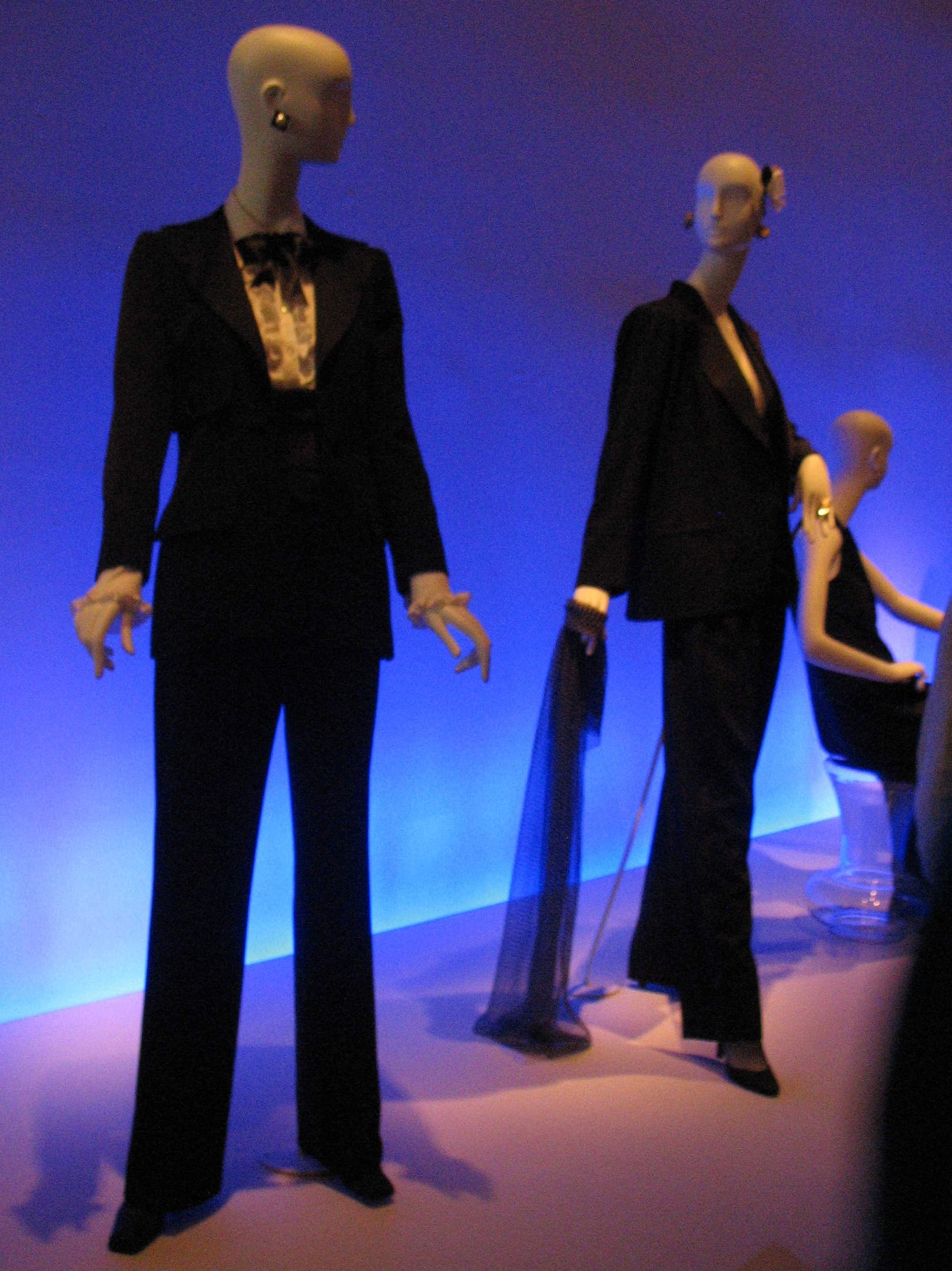
Yves Saint Laurent, the tuxedo suit "Le Smoking", created in 1966

In the 20th century, starting around World War I traditional gender roles blurred and fashion pioneers such as Paul Poiret and Coco Chanel introduced trousers to women's fashion. The "flapper style" for women of this era included trousers and a chic bob, which gave women an androgynous look. Coco Chanel, who had a love for wearing trousers herself, created trouser designs for women such as beach pajamas and horse-riding attire. During the 1930s, glamorous actresses such as Marlene Dietrich fascinated and shocked many with their strong desire to wear trousers and adopt the androgynous style. Dietrich is remembered as one of the first actresses to wear trousers in a premiere.

Throughout the 1960s and 1970s, the women's liberation movement is likely to have contributed to ideas and influenced fashion designers, such as Yves Saint Laurent. Yves Saint Laurent designed the Le Smoking suit and introduced it in 1966, while Helmut Newton's erotized androgynous photographs of the suit made it iconic and a classic.

Elvis Presley introduced an androgynous style in rock'n'roll. His pretty face and use of eye makeup often made people think he was a rather "effeminate guy", When the Rolling Stones played London's Hyde Park in 1969, Mick Jagger wore a white "man's dress" designed by Michael Fish. Fish was the most fashionable shirt-maker in London, the inventor of the Kipper tie, and a principal taste-maker of the peacock revolution in men's fashion. His creation for Mick Jagger was considered to be the epitome of the swinging 60s.

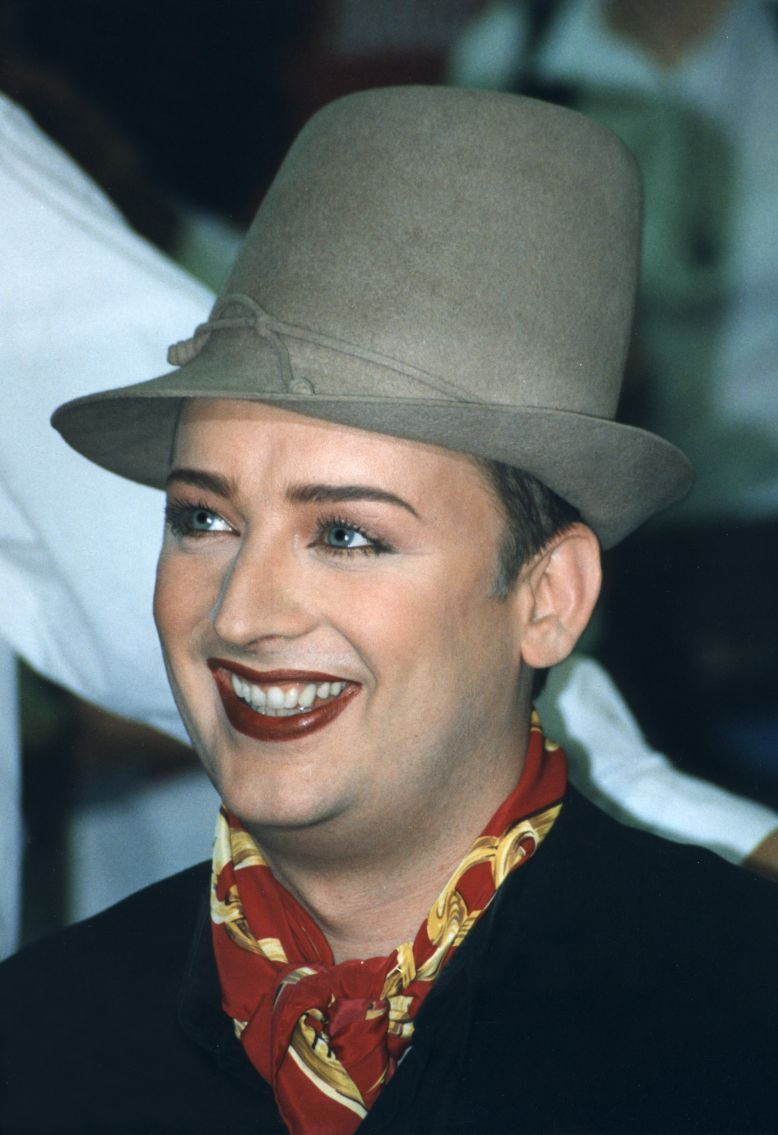
Pop stars Boy George (pictured) and Annie Lennox appeared on the front cover of Smash Hits magazine in December 1983 in identical makeup, followed by the cover of Newsweek in January 1984 to mark a second British Invasion. Music journalist Sue Steward wrote that the Smash Hits cover "begged the question, 'Which one is the boy?'"

In 1972, David Bowie presented his alter ego Ziggy Stardust, a character that was a symbol of sexual ambiguity when he launched the album The Rise and Fall of Ziggy Stardust and Spiders from Mars. Marc Bolan, the other pioneer of glam rock, performed on the BBC's Top of the Pops in 1971 wearing glitter and satins, with The Independent stating his appearance "permitted a generation of teeny-boppers to begin playing with the idea of androgyny". The 1973 West End musical The Rocky Horror Show also depicted sexual fluidity.

Continuing into the 1980s, the rise of avant-garde fashion designers like Yohji Yamamoto, challenged the social constructs around gender. They reinvigorated androgyny in fashion, addressing gender issues. This was also reflected within pop culture icons during the 1980s, such as Grace Jones, Prince, Annie Lennox and Boy George.

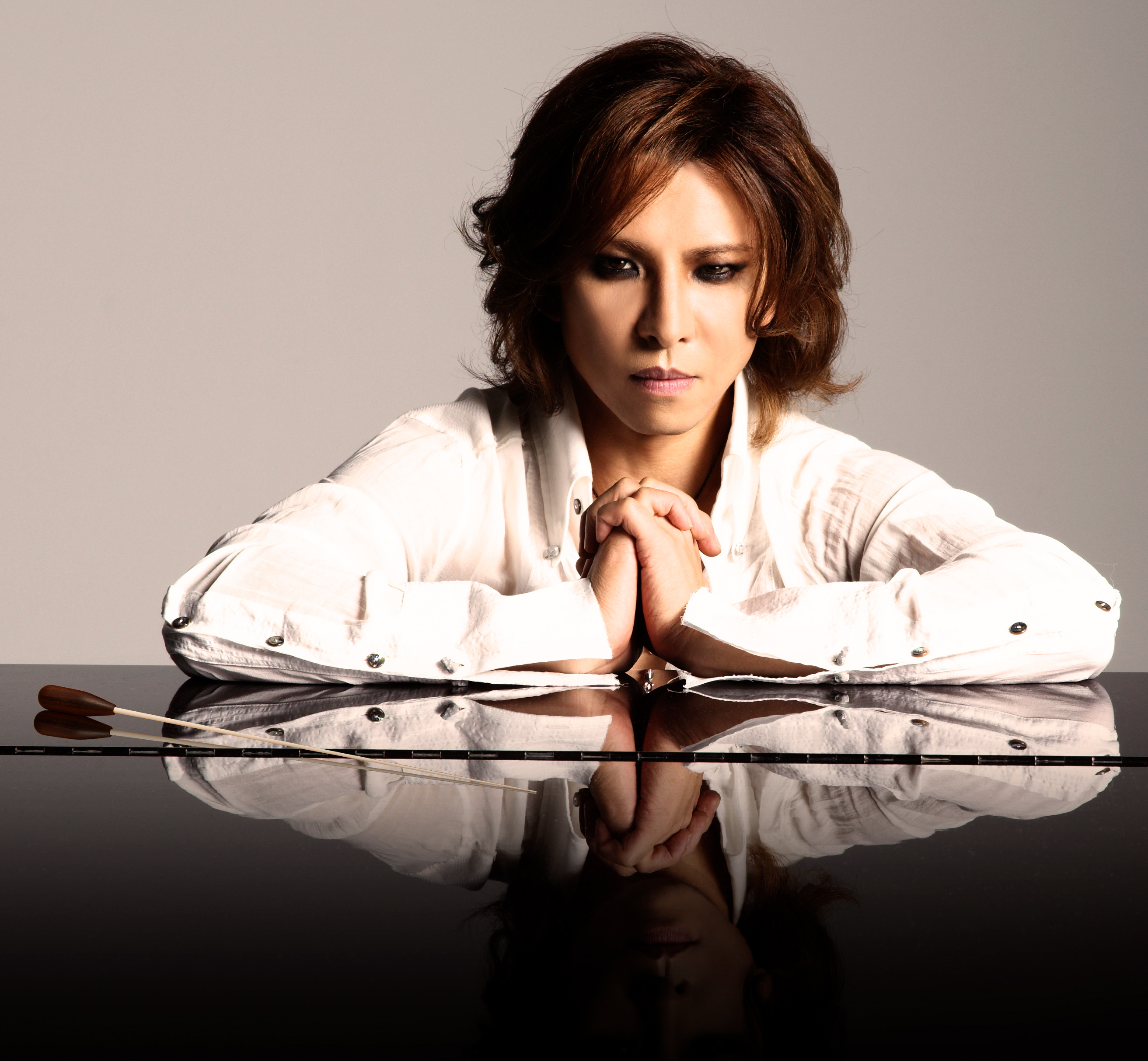
X Japan founder Yoshiki is often labelled androgynous, known for having worn lace dresses and acting effeminate during performances.

Power dressing for women became even more prominent within the 1980s which was previously only something done by men in order to look structured and powerful. However, during the 1980s this began to take a turn as women were entering jobs with equal roles to the men. In the article "The Menswear Phenomenon" by Kathleen Beckett written for Vogue in 1984 the concept of power dressing is explored as women entered these jobs they had no choice but to tailor their wardrobes accordingly, eventually leading the ascension of power dressing as a popular style for women. Women begin to find through fashion they can incite men to pay more attention to the seduction of their mental prowess rather, than the physical attraction of their appearance. This influence in the fashion world quickly makes its way to the world of film, with movies like "Working Girl" using power dressing women as their main subject matter.

Japanese designers began popularizing androgynous fashion in the 1980s, as seen in the work of Yohji Yamamoto and Rei Kawakubo, who brought in a distinct Japanese style that adopted a distinctively gender ambiguous theme. These two designers consider themselves a part of the avant-garde, reinvigorating Japanism. Yamamoto has expressed the lack of necessity behind gender distinctions, stating "I always wonder who decided that there should be a difference in the clothes of men and women"

Also during the 1980s, Grace Jones, a singer and fashion model, gender-thwarted appearance in the 1980s, which startled the public. Her androgynous style inspired many and she became an androgynous style icon for modern celebrities. Androgyny has been gaining more prominence in popular culture in the early 21st century. Both the fashion industry and pop culture have accepted and even popularized the "androgynous" look, with several current celebrities being hailed as creative trendsetters.

The rise of the metrosexual in the first decade of the 2000s has also been described as a related phenomenon associated with this trend. Traditional gender stereotypes have been challenged and changed since the 1960s, which included the hippie movement and flower power. Artists in film such as Leonardo DiCaprio sported the "skinny" look in the 1990s, a departure from traditional masculinity, which resulted in the fad "Leo Mania". Musical stars such as Kurt Cobain of Nirvana, Andre 3000, and the band Placebo have used clothing and makeup to popularize androgynous and genderqueer aesthetics throughout the 1990s and the first decade of the 2000s.

While the 1990s unrolled and fashion developed an affinity for unisex clothes, there was a rise of designers who favored that look, including Helmut Lang, Giorgio Armani, and Pierre Cardin. Men in catalogues started wearing jewellery, make up, visual kei, and designer stubble. These styles have become a significant mainstream trend of the 21st century, both in the Western world and in Asia. Japanese and Korean cultures have featured the androgynous look as a positive attribute in society, as depicted in both K-pop, J-pop, in anime and manga, as well as the fashion industry.

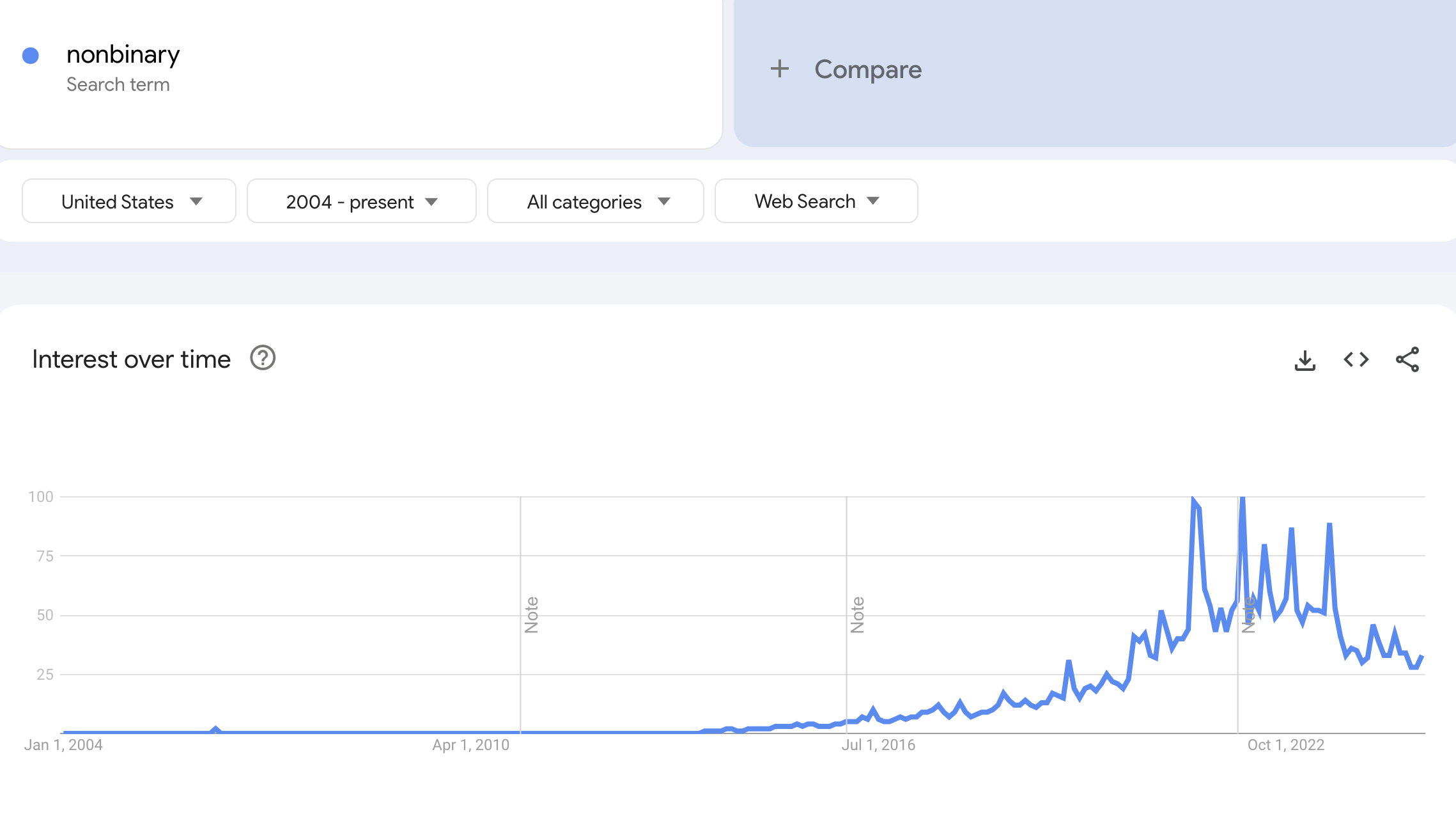
Data source: Google Trends (https://trends.google.com/trends/explore?date=all&geo=US&q=nonbinary)

The 21st century additionally saw global conversations around gender identity which helped further the presence of androgyny in fashion. In the mid-2010s, online searches for the word "nonbinary" skyrocketed, and young people began to see themselves as nonbinary or gender nonconforming. Actor Lachlan Watson, who uses they/them pronouns, posted a photo on Instagram wearing a t-shirt saying "Gender is Over," a riff on the John Lennon and Yoko Ono "War is Over" poster.

Singer Billie Eilish has also openly called gender roles "ancient." Since her musical debut in 2016, Eilish has worn both traditionally masculine and feminine silhouettes, wearing a Marilyn Monroe inspired Oscar de la Renta gown to the Met Gala in 2021 to being referred to as a "hey mamas" lesbian after an appearance on Chicken Shop Date in 2024 where she wore an oversized tee, bandana, and backwards cap.. In the emerging electronic music scene, singer and artist 2hollis expressed that acts such as wearing makeup and wigs should not be "inherently feminine," and that Prince was an inspiration when learning to express himself in a way that's not limited by gender.

== Symbols and iconography ==
In the ancient and medieval worlds, androgynous people and hermaphrodites were represented in art by the caduceus, a wand of transformative power in ancient Greco-Roman mythology. The caduceus was created by Tiresias and represents his transformation into a woman by Juno in punishment for striking at mating snakes. The caduceus was later carried by Hermes/Mercury and was the basis for the astronomical symbol for the planet Mercury and the botanical sign for hermaphrodite. That sign is now sometimes used for transgender people.

Another common androgyny icon in the medieval and early modern period was the Rebis, a conjoined male and female figure, often with solar and lunar motifs. Still another symbol was what is today called sun cross, which united the cross (or saltire) symbol for male with the circle for female. This sign is now the astronomical symbol for the planet Earth.

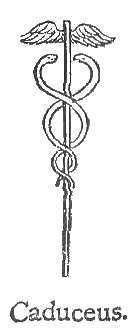
The caduceus

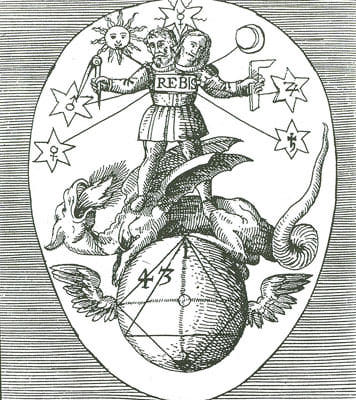
A rebis from 1617

Mercury symbol derived from the caduceus

"Rose and Cross" androgyne symbol

Alternate "rose and cross" version

== See also ==
- List of androgynous people
- List of transgender-related topics
- Epicenity
- Futanari
- Gender bender
- Gender dysphoria
- Gender neutrality
- Gender non-conformity
- Gonochorism
- Gynandromorphism
- Gynomorph
- Postgenderism
- Sexual orientation hypothesis
- Soft butch
- Third gender
- True hermaphroditism
