= Gender and Jewish studies =

Concepts of gender in the Jewish religion and culture

Gender and Jewish studies is an emerging subfield at the intersection of gender studies, queer studies, and Jewish studies. Gender studies centers on interdisciplinary research on the phenomenon of gender, and focuses on cultural representations of gender and people's lived experience. Similarly, queer studies focuses on the cultural representations and lived experiences of LGBTQ+ identities and critiques hetero-normative values of sex and sexuality. Jewish studies is a field that looks at Jews and Judaism, through such disciplines as history, anthropology, literary studies, linguistics, and sociology. As such, scholars of Gender and Jewish studies focus on gender as the basis through which to understand historical and contemporary Jewish societies. This field recognizes that much of recorded Jewish history and academic writing is told from the perspective of “the male Jew” and fails to accurately represent the diverse experiences of Jews with non-dominant gender identities.

== History ==
Jewish law, or halacha, recognizes intersex and non-conforming gender identities in addition to male and female. Rabbinical literature recognizes six different genders, defined according to the development and presentation of primary and secondary sex characteristics at birth and later in life, and includes descriptions such as the concept of a tumtum, being a person of ambiguous gender, and the concept of the androgynos, being a person characterized as possessing elements of both sexes. One aspect of Gender and Jewish studies is considering how the ambiguity recognized in Rabbinical literature has been erased and constructed into a binary and how this translates into modern Jewish practices.

Gender as it relates to Jewish studies has drawn increasing scholarly interest due in part to the founding of the U.S.-based Association for Jewish Studies' (AJS) Women's Caucus in 1968, as well as gender studies and Jewish studies gaining interest as areas of academic study in the 1980s and fueled as well by popular and academic attention to Jewish feminism. The AJS's Women's Caucus works "to advance the study of gender and intersectionality within the Association for Jewish Studies" and within the wider academic community and has widely influenced Jewish studies as a whole to incorporate a gendered perspective in Jewish scholarship. AJS holds at least one panel on gender every annual meeting, provides funding for presentations on gender and Judaism and published a collection of syllabi pertaining to gender. As universities established women's studies programs, they were often highly influenced and connected to Jewish studies as well. In 1997, Brandeis University established the Hadassah-Brandeis Institute, the first university-based research institution dedicated to Gender and Jewish studies. The institution aims to "develop fresh ways of thinking about Jews and gender worldwide by producing and promoting scholarly research and artistic projects." The Hadassah-Brandeis Institute publishes books and journals, holds conferences, and provides funding for Gender and Jewish Studies scholarship. For example, the Nashim Journal is a bi-annual academic journal dedicated to the advancement of Gender and Jewish studies, was co-founded by the Hadassah-Brandeis Institute and the Schechter Institute of Jewish Studies in Jerusalem. Additionally, this scholarship is not limited to the United States, or countries with historically large Jewish populations, with contributions being made from Jewish Studies departments at academic institutions across the globe.

In addition, controversies over the role of women in Jewish denominations and the gender separation in Orthodox Judaism has drawn attention to gender roles as constructed and regulated by religious institutions. For this reason, besides the academic attention, the liberal Jewish movements turn to gender and Judaism to reinforce their own mission and identity. Notably, the Reconstructionist Rabbinical College has established the Gottesman Chair in Gender and Judaism and operates Kolot — the Center for Jewish Women's and Gender Studies ", the first such center established at a rabbinical seminary (1996).

== Terms ==
- Zachar (זָכָר): This term is usually translated as "male" in English.
- Neqeva (נְקֵבָה): This term is derived from the word for a crevice and probably refers to a vaginal opening. It is usually translated as "female" in English.
- Androgynos (אנדרוגינוס): A person who has both "male" and "female" physical sexual characteristics. 149 references in the Mishnah and Talmud (1st–8th centuries); 350 in classical midrash and Jewish law codes (2nd–16th centuries). According to Rabbi Meir in the Mishnah, it is "a unique creature, neither male nor female".
- Tumtum (טומטום): A person whose sexual characteristics are indeterminate or obscured. 181 references in the Mishnah and Talmud; 335 in classical midrash and Jewish law codes. Rabbi Meir contrasts it with the androgynos, saying it is not a unique creation, "sometimes a man and sometimes a woman". Unlike the androgynos, the tumtum's gender can be revealed to be either male or female and as such has different roles under Jewish Law. Some Rabbi believe Abraham and Sarah were described to be tumtum, unable to conceive before God intervened.
- Ayelonit (איילונית): A female who does not develop secondary sex characteristics at puberty and is assumed infertile.
- Saris (סריס): A male who does not develop secondary sex characteristics at puberty or has their sex characteristics removed. A saris can fall into one of two categories: One can be "naturally" born a saris (saris hamah) or one can become a saris through human intervention (saris adam).

== Scope ==
The history Gender and Jewish studies began primarily through research on Jewish women and the role of women in Judaism and Jewish culture.

Nonetheless, gender and Jewish studies also investigate the gender phenomena pertaining to men and masculinity. In addition, the subfield encompasses research on Jewish views on homosexuality and queer theory as these pertain to Jews and Judaism.

In historical terms, gender and Jewish studies span a broad range, from Biblical exegesis, research on rabbinic literature, Medieval Jewish culture, the importance of gender in Jewish responses to modernity, and gender identity politics in the contemporary period.

There is a growing subfield in the study of gender and Judaism, which sees the binaries of male and female as crucial constructs in Jewish thought.

While the male/female dialectic first makes its appearance in the story of creation, the Talmud insists that the idea of male and female extends way beyond sex roles: "Rav Yehuda says that Rav says: Everything that the Holy One, Blessed be He, created in His world, He created male and female. [...] (Isaiah 27:1)".

This dialectic takes on even greater theological significance in light of the Song of Songs, which has been traditionally interpreted as a metaphor for the relationship between God and the Nation of Israel, where the Nation of Israel is cast as feminine towards God, who is represented in the story by the male lover.

Other examples of topics in which the male/female dynamic is used metaphorically include: the relationship between Shabbat and the days of the week, the relationship between the Oral and Written Law, the relationship between This World and the Next, the interplay between the legal and extra-legal aspects of Talmud (halacha and aggadah), and the Jewish calendar, which makes use of both the sun (traditionally symbolic of the male force) and the moon (traditionally symbolic of the female force).

There is also a movement among queer and gender nonconforming Jews to use Torah as a basis for questioning a gender binary. These conversations are more present in Reconstructionist and Reform Judaism, but they also appear in Orthodox Judaism.

== See also ==
- Gender separation in Judaism
- Jewish feminism
- Women in Judaism
- Kate Bornstein, gender theorist raised Conservative
- Daniel Boyarin, gender and Talmudic culture scholar
- Judith Butler, gender theorist and a self-described anti-Zionist Jewish American
- Nice Jewish boy, on masculinity
- Elana Maryles Sztokman, Jewish feminist author and thought-leader
- Jay Michaelson, queer theorist and Kabbalist.
- Shulamith Firestone, radical feminist theorist raised Orthodox
- Miriam Kosman, Orthodox Jewish scholar and author on gender and Judaism
- Kalonymus ben Kalonymus
- Devorah Heshelis, Orthodox author about women's status in Judaism
- Joy Ladin, first transgender professor at an Orthodox University and prominent scholar on transgender theology.
- Judith Plaskow, American Theologian and Jewish Feminism scholar.
- Gunther Plaut American Reform Rabbi
- Tamar Ross Israeli Philosopher has made significant contributions to considering gender in Jewish scholarship.

== Bibliography ==
- Gray, Hillel. 2015. “The Transitioning of Jewish Biomedical Law: Rhetorical and Practical Shifts in Halakhic Discourse on Sex-Change Surgery.” Nashim 29: 81–107
- Crincoli, Markus. 2015–16. “Religious Sex Status and the Implications for Transgender and Gender Nonconforming People.” FIU Law Review 11: 137–148.
- Englander, Yakir. 2014. “ םירשעההאמבתירבהתוצראבםימרופרהםינברהדוגיאברקבתינימדחהתוינימהתסיפת תיריווקתרוקיב : ותקיספלעהתעפשהו] “ The Concept of Homosexuality Among the Union of American Reform Rabbis in the Twentieth Century and its Effect on its Responsa: a Queer Critique]. In הרבחותוברת , תוגה : תימרופרהתודהיה] Reform Judaism: Thought, Culture and Sociology], edited by Avinoam Rosenak, 213–227. Jerusalem: Hakibbutz Hameu’chad (Hebrew).
- Lori Hope Lefkovitz. "Reflections on the Future of Jewish Feminism and Jewish Feminist Scholarship" in Nashim: A Journal of Jewish Women's Studies & Gender Issues 10 (2005) 218-224 The author holds the Gottesman Chair in Gender and Judaism at the Reconstructionist Rabbinical College; founded and is the Director of Kolot: Center for Jewish Women and Gender Studies at RRC
- Heyes, Cressida. 2003. “Feminist Solidarity After Queer Theory: The Case of Transgender.” Signs 28 (4): 1093–1120.
- Ladin, Joy. 2018a. “In the Image of God, God Created Them: Toward Trans Theology (Roundtable).” Journal of Feminist Studies in Religion 34 (1): 53–58.
- Ladin, Joy. 2018b. The Soul of the Stranger: Reading God and Torah from a Transgender Perspective. Waltham: Brandeis University Press.
- Plaskow, Judith. 2010. “Dismantling the Gender Binary Within Judaism: The Challenge of Transgender to Compulsory Heterosexuality.” In Balancing on the Mechitza – Transgender in Jewish Community, edited by Noach Dzmura, 187–210. Berkeley, CA: North Atlantic Books
- "Passing as a Man: Narratives of Jewish Gender Performance," in Narrative, 10/1 (2002).
- Kosman, Miriam, Circle, Arrow, Spiral, Exploring Gender in Judaism, Menucha Publishers, 2014
- Sarah Bunin Benor. "Talmid Chachams and Tsedeykeses: Language, Learnedness, and Masculinity Among Orthodox Jews," by Jewish Social Studies; Fall 2004, Vol. 11 Issue 1, p147-170.
- Jewish Women's Archives
- Rivkah Teitz Blau. Gender relationships in marriage and out. Orthodox Forum series. New York; Jersey City, NJ: Michael Scharf Publication Trust of the Yeshiva University Press; Distributed by KTAV Pub. House, 2007. ISBN 978-0-88125-971-1.
- Devorah Heshelis, The Moon's Lost Light, Targum Press, 2004
- Daniel Boyarin, Daniel Itzkovitz and Ann Pellegrini. Queer theory and the Jewish question. Between men—between women. New York: Columbia University Press, 2003. ISBN 0-231-11374-9, ISBN 0-231-11375-7.
- Daniel Boyarin. Unheroic conduct : the rise of heterosexuality and the invention of the Jewish man. Contraversions. 8, Berkeley: University of California Press, 1997. ISBN 0-520-21050-6.
- Carnal Israel : reading sex in Talmudic culture. The New historicism. 25, Berkeley: University of California Press, 1993. ISBN 0-520-08012-2.
- Jonathan Boyarin and Daniel Boyarin. Jews and other differences : the new Jewish cultural studies. Minneapolis, Minn.: University of Minnesota Press, 1997. ISBN 0-8166-2750-9, ISBN 0-8166-2751-7.
- Andrea Dworkin. Scapegoat: The Jews, Israel, and Women's Liberation (2000) ISBN 0-684-83612-2
- Charlotte Elisheva Fonrobert. Menstrual purity : rabbinic and Christian reconstructions of Biblical gender. Contraversions. Stanford, CA: Stanford University Press, 2000. ISBN 0-8047-3725-8.
- Jonathan Frankel. Jews and gender : the challenge to hierarchy. Studies in contemporary Jewry. 16, Oxford; New York: Oxford University Press, 2000. ISBN 0-19-514081-8.
- Mark H. Gelber. Melancholy pride : nation, race, and gender in the German literature of cultural Zionism. Conditio Judaica. 23, Tübingen: M. Niemeyer, 2000. ISBN 3-484-65123-7.
- Sander L. Gilman. Freud, race, and gender. Princeton, N.J.: Princeton University Press, 1993. ISBN 0-691-03245-9.
- Leonard J. Greenspoon, Ronald Simkins, Jean Axelrad Cahan, Philip M. and Ethel Klutznick Chair in Jewish Civilization, University of Nebraska—Lincoln. Harris Center for Judaic Studies and Creighton University. Center for the Study of Religion and Society. Women and Judaism. Studies in Jewish civilization. 14, Omaha, NE; Lincoln, NE: Creighton University Press; Distributed by the University of Nebraska Press, 2003. ISBN 1-881871-43-6.
- Joel Lurie Grishaver. The bonding of Isaac : stories and essays about gender and Jewish spirituality. Los Angeles, CA: Alef Design Group, 1997. ISBN 1-881283-20-8.
- Nancy A. Harrowitz and Barbara Hyams. Jews & gender : responses to Otto Weininger. Philadelphia: Temple University Press, 1995. ISBN 1-56639-248-9, ISBN 1-56639-249-7.
- Lawrence A. Hoffman. Covenant of blood : circumcision and gender in rabbinic Judaism. Chicago studies in the history of Judaism. Chicago: University of Chicago Press, 1996. ISBN 0-226-34783-4, ISBN 0-226-34784-2.
- Tsipy Ivry. Embodying Culture: Pregnancy in Japan and Israel. Studies in Medical Anthropology. Rutgers University Press, 2009. ISBN 978-0-8135-4636-0, ISBN 978-0-8135-4635-3.
- Walter Jacob and Moshe Zemer. Gender issues in Jewish law : essays and responsa. Studies in progressive halakhah. New York: Berghahn Books, 2001. ISBN 1-57181-239-3.
- Rosemary Skinner Keller, Rosemary Radford Ruether and Marie Cantlon. Encyclopedia of women and religion in North America. Bloomington: Indiana University Press, 2006. ISBN 0-253-34685-1; 025334686X; 0253346878; 0253346886; 9780253346858; 9780253346865; 9780253346872; 9780253346889.
- Orah Kohen. Mi-shene ʻevre ha-mehitsah : li-she'elat ha-hafradah ha-migdarit ba-halakhah ha-Yehudit. Elhanah: O. Kohen, 2007. ISBN 965-7402-04-2.
- Kristen E. Kvam, Linda S. Schearing and Valarie H. Ziegler. Eve and Adam : Jewish, Christian, and Muslim readings on Genesis and gender. Bloomington: Indiana University Press, 1999. ISBN 0-253-33490-X; 0253212715.
- Jacob Lassner. Demonizing the Queen of Sheba : boundaries of gender and culture in postbiblical Judaism and medieval Islam. Chicago studies in the history of Judaism. Chicago: University of Chicago Press, 1993. ISBN 0-226-46913-1, ISBN 0-226-46915-8.
- Hara Person, Carolyn Bricklin, Owen Gottlieb, Melissa Zalkin Stollman and Doug Barden. The gender gap : a congregational guide for beginning the conversation about men's involvement in synagogue life. New York: URJ Press, 2007. ISBN 978-0-8074-1058-5, ISBN 0-8074-1058-6.
- Miriam Peskowitz. Spinning fantasies : rabbis, gender, and history. Contraversions. 9, Berkeley: University of California Press, 1997. ISBN 0-520-20831-5, ISBN 0-520-20967-2.
- Robert Leonard Platzner. Gender, tradition, and renewal Robert L. Platzner. Religions and discourse. 13, Oxford; New York: Peter Lang, 2005. ISBN 3-906769-64-X; 0820459011.
- Jacqueline Portuguese. Fertility policy in Israel : the politics of religion, gender, and nation. Westport, Conn.: Praeger, 1998. ISBN 0-275-96098-6.
- Melissa Raphael. The female face of God in Auschwitz : a Jewish feminist theology of the Holocaust. Religion and gender. London; New York: Routledge, 2003. ISBN 0-415-23664-9, ISBN 0-415-23665-7.
- Jennifer Ring. The political consequences of thinking : gender and Judaism in the work of Hannah Arendt. SUNY series in political theory. Albany, N.Y.: State University of New York Press, 1997. ISBN 0-7914-3483-4, ISBN 0-7914-3484-2.
- Susan Starr Sered. What makes women sick?: maternity, modesty, and militarism in Israeli society. Brandeis University Press, 2000.
- Linda M. Shires. Coming home : a woman's story of conversion to Judaism. Boulder, Colo.: Westview Press, 2003. ISBN 0-8133-6596-1.
- Claire M. Tylee. "In the open" : Jewish women writers and British culture. Newark: University of Delaware Press, 2006. ISBN 0-87413-933-3, ISBN 978-0-87413-933-4.
- Claudia Ulbrich. Shulamit and Margarete : power, gender, and religion in a rural society in eighteenth-century Europe. Boston: Brill Academic Publishers, 2005. ISBN 0-391-04227-0.
- Elaine Wainwright. Women healinghealing women : the genderization of healing in early Christianity. BibleWorld. London; Oakville, CT: Equinox Pub. Ltd., 2006. ISBN 1-84553-134-5, ISBN 1-84553-135-3.
- Elliot R. Wolfson. Language, eros, being : kabbalistic hermeneutics and poetic imagination. New York: Fordham University Press, 2005. ISBN 0-8232-2418-X; 0823224198.
- Circle in the square : studies in the use of gender in Kabbalistic symbolism. Albany: State University of New York Press, 1995. ISBN 0-7914-2405-7, ISBN 0-7914-2406-5.
- Diane Wolfthal. Picturing Yiddish : gender, identity, and memory in the illustrated Yiddish books of Renaissance Italy. Brill's series in Jewish studies. 36, Leiden: Boston : Brill, 2004. ISBN 90-04-13905-2.
- Helena Zlotnick. Dinah's daughters : gender and Judaism from the Hebrew Bible to late antiquity. Philadelphia: University of Pennsylvania Press, 2002. ISBN 0-8122-3644-0, ISBN 0-8122-1797-7.
- "More than Just Male and Female: The Six Genders in Ancient Jewish Thought." Freidson, Sarah. Sefaria, 10 June 2016.
- Kaplan, Marion A.; Moore, Deborah Dash, eds. (2011). Gender and Jewish history. The modern Jewish experience. Bloomington: Indiana University Press.
- Yahalom, Shalem (2022). "Differentiation in the Gender Segregation Rules of Ultra-Orthodox Judaism". Shofar: An Interdisciplinary Journal of Jewish Studies. 40 (1): 88–106.
- Mandel, Hadas; Birgier, Debora P. (2016), Khattab, Nabil; Miaari, Sami; Stier, Haya (eds.), "The Gender Revolution in Israel: Progress and Stagnation", Socioeconomic Inequality in Israel, New York: Palgrave Macmillan US, pp. 153–184
