= Kagome Kagome (manga) =

Japanese manga series by Toshiki Yui

- First tankōbon volume cover

かごめかごめ
- Manga
- Written by: Toshiki Yui
- Published by: Shueisha
- Magazine: Ultra Jump
- Original run: May 20, 1999 – June 19, 2001
- Volumes: 3

Kagome Kagome (かごめかごめ) (Note: The title refers to bird-in-the-cage, a game in which a blindfolded child sits in a spinning circle of children and guesses the person behind them.) is a Japanese manga series written and illustrated by Toshiki Yui. It was serialized in Shueisha's seinen manga magazine Ultra Jump from May 1999 to June 2001, with its chapters collected in three tankōbon volumes.

== Publication ==
Written and illustrated by Toshiki Yui, Kagome Kagome was serialized in Shueisha's seinen manga magazine Ultra Jump from May 20, 1999, (Note: It started in the 30th issue of the magazine, released on May 20, 1999.) to June 19, 2001. (Note: It finished in the magazine's July 2001 issue, released on June 21 of that same year.) Shueisha collected its chapters in three tankōbon volumes, released from February 18, 2002, to September 19, 2001.

The series was digitally published in English by JManga in 2011. It was also licensed in France, Italy, and Germany by Panini Comics.

=== Volume list ===
No.	Release date	ISBN
1	February 18, 2000	978-4-08-875888-6
1. How We Met (と初めて会った, To Hajimete Atta); 2. Alone All Night (単独ですべての夜, Tandoku De Subete No Yoru); 3. The Weave Between Us (私たちの間に織り, Watashi Tachi No Ma Ni Ori); 4. The Aim of the Weave (の目的は、織物の, No Mokuteki Ha, Orimono No); 5. The True Form of the Ghost (と、幽霊の真のフォーム, To, Yūrei No Shin No Fōmu); 6. The Seal is Released... (のシールがリリースされる..., No Shiiru Ga Ririisusareru...); 7. Inside the Abandoned Well (さて、放置中, Sate, Hōchi Chū); 8. The Woman's Problems Continue (女性の問題を続ける, Josei No Mondai o Tsudukeru)
2	October 19, 2000	978-4-08-876081-0
9. Naive Invitations (素朴な招待状, Soboku Na Shōtai Jō); 10. Rapidly Approaching Kagome!! (カゴメは急速に接近！, Kagome Ha Kyūsoku Ni Sekkin!); 11. The Ghost Appears!! (と、幽霊が表示される！, To, Yūrei Ga Hyōji Sa Reru!); 12. Masami's Courage (車田の勇気, Kurumada No Yūki); 13. Into the Rapids (急流に, Kyūryū Ni); 14. Confrontation!! (対決！, Taiketsu!); 15. The Enigma Deepens (このエニグマを前後に深く, Kono Eniguma O Zengo Ni Fukaku); 16. The Un-returnable Room (国連-通いルーム, Kokuren- Gayoi Rūmu)
3	September 19, 2001	978-4-08-876213-5
17. The Other Side of the Wall (壁の向こう側, Kabe No Mukō Gawa); 18. 5 Alternate Stairs (5代替階段, 5 Daitai Kaidan); 19. The Blood Awakens... (血覚醒..., Chi Kakusei...); 20. Helpless Isolation!! (無力な絶縁！, Muryoku Na Zetsuen!); 21. To the Depths of the Earth!! (地球の深さ！, Chikyū No Fuka Sa!); 22. The Legend of the Dragon Hole (伝説のドラゴンホールの, Densetsu No Doragon Hōru No); 23. Mother's Confession (母の告白, Haha No Kokuhaku); 24. Kagome's Fate (カゴメの運命, Kagome No Unmei); 25. Kagome Kagome (かごめかごめ)

== Reception ==
Manga Sanctuary series of reviews, regards the characters to be "less endearing" than those of Yui's Kirara, and the humor to be "less effective" in the first volume review, goes further in criticism by describing the second volume reading experience as devoid of emotion and the last volume as leaving a bitter after taste so much the manga is ill built and rushed. The French manga dictionary Dicomanga pointed to the author's large usage of computer software which gives a particular yet slightly icy tone to his universe. SplashComics noted that the author used the technique of using photographs as backgrounds. SplashComics described the second volume as being "a typical Yui: Girls and ghosts", noting that although the series was tamer than Kirara, that fanservice was provided via tight shirts and short skirts, and felt the ending was "a little disappointing".
