= Hot Tails =

Manga by Toshiki Yui

ジャンクション (Jankushon)
- Genre: Comedy, futanari, hentai
- Manga
- Written by: Toshiki Yui
- Published by: Byakuya Shobo
- English publisher: Eros Comix
- Original run: 1993 – 1994
- Volumes: 2

Hot Tails (ジャンクション, Jankushon; lit. Junction) is an erotic manga series by Toshiki Yui.

== Plot ==
Hot Tails is an anthology containing mostly stand-alone chapters, with a few recurring characters. Many of them are high school students, portrayed as being 18 years of age at least. Notable characters include:

- Kanomi Nakajima, a pretty blonde who is also a futanari
- The School Doctor Shizuka, who helps Kanomi to understand and eventually accept her unusual physiology
- Mika and Yuka, identical twin sisters who experience each other's sensations through haptic telepathy, including pain and pleasure – they seem to attend Kanomi's school
- Hiromi, a classmate of Kanomi's who blows her cover
  - In her own story, Hiromi is seduced by a water elemental whilst swimming on holiday; thinking it was a man, she applies multiple times to join the Mile High Club on her flight home, trying to find 'him' again
- Masami Hoshino, a brunette who's tricked into having sex with a quick succession of boys by Mika
- Mariko, another futanari who becomes engaged to Kanomi
- Nami, a girl who wanders into a bizarre lingerie shop and acquires a pair of 'techno-panties', equipped with bio-textile vibrators that sense her mood
- Nao, a flat-chested blonde who wakes up one morning with massive breasts – much to the surprise of the boy next door, he soon discovers that she's 'grown' elsewhere too
- Miki and Tetsuya, a young couple who fall afoul of a curse placed on the latter by...
- The Demon, a tall blond di-phallic humanoid who double-penetrates Miki on his own – until Tetsuya intervenes

Other stories featuring minor characters involve:

- an inter dimensional portal appears in the house of a girl who ends up trapped halfway through it, and has sex with Santa Claus and a reindeer girl (in a similar style to a bunny girl)
- a girl who winds up having sex in a glass phone booth – while in mid-call
- a female fantasy-RPG warrior who is attacked by two shapeshifting warlocks
- three female hunters in the year 20X0 who hunt men down, have sex with them to propagate the human race, and then kill them for food
- a young girl caught out late at night, who is abducted and 'experimented' on by alien creatures
- a tourist in a fantasy land – which turns out to be Yui's surreal depiction of Europe – who is rescued from trouble by another female warrior
- three students who find what they think is an extremely lifelike sex toy – but it's actually the real penis that has fallen off a boy, who vanishes when the three girls have a threesome using it

In volume 2, the Demon has sex with Kanomi and three other women, but is interrupted by his wife, Meru. She summons other demons, including her father, the Demon King, who all join the orgy. Characters from Yui's other works also arrive, but the orgy is interrupted again by the Demon King's wife, the Demon Queen.

== Reception ==
Derek Guder, writing about Hot Tails, described Yui as "an adult manga king", enjoying his unique "mix of sex, humor, and bizarre imagination. He simply lets his id run wild, and we get stories that are as surreal as they are sexual". Guder found the artwork of Hot Tails "still a bit unpolished and busy in these older stories, but his style is undeniable. The art is gorgeous, the ladies are sexy, and the premises too bizarre not to enjoy", giving it a rating of four out of four stars. Yui's Hot Tails has been called the best known exponent of the futanari genre in the West. Yui's earlier work, Wingding Party, was translated into English as Wingding Orgy: Hot Tails Extreme due to the popularity of Hot Tails, despite there being no connection between the two series.

Trisha L. Sebastian, writing for Sequential Tart, liked Hot Tails because she found it "funny as well as being sexy", and enjoyed Yui's use of recurring characters. animePRO noted that the variety of sexual situations did not extend to male-male intercourse, and found it "amazing" that the futanari's penis was able to "rotate 180 degrees and they could satisfy themselves", summing it up as "the main thing is that it's fun, all without, of course, prevention".
