= Toshiki Yui =

Japanese seinen manga artist (born 1956)

- Born: 唯 登詩樹; 1956 (age 69–70); Kyoto, Kyoto Prefecture, Japan
- Known for: Manga
- Notable work: Kirara, Kagome Kagome
- Movement: Erotic manga
- Website: www.yui-toshiki.com

Toshiki Yui (唯 登詩樹, Yui Toshiki) (born 1956 in Kyoto Prefecture, Japan) is a Japanese seinen manga artist. Some of his early work was published under the name Masaki Katō (加藤 雅基, Katō Masaki). He has been publishing since 1986.

Yui is known for his computer-assisted drawings, manga, and web-images of pretty and sexy girls (bishōjo). He specializes in romantic comedies, sometimes supernatural and often sexually explicit, about these girls and their male and female friends.

Three of his works have been translated into English, Misty Girl Extreme, Hot Tails, and Wingding Orgy. Writing about Kagome, Kagome, the French manga dictionary Dicomanga pointed to Yui's large usage of computer software which gives a particular yet slightly icy tone to his universe. Also writing about Kagome, Kagome, SplashComics noted that Yui used the technique of using photographs as backgrounds. Derek Guder, writing about Hot Tails, described Yui as "an adult manga king", enjoying his unique "mix of sex, humor, and bizarre imagination. He simply lets his id run wild, and we get stories that are as surreal as they are sexual". Guder found the artwork of Hot Tails "still a bit unpolished and busy in these older stories, but his style is undeniable. The art is gorgeous, the ladies are sexy, and the premises too bizarre not to enjoy", giving it a rating of four out of four stars. Yui's Hot Tails has been called the best known exponent of the futanari genre in the West.

== Works ==
=== As Masaki Katō ===
- Batoru Sutaffu (バトルスタッフ, Battle Staff) (1986)
- Kaori Paradaisu (KAORI パラダイス, Kaori Paradise) (1986)
- Aamusu (アームス, Arms) (1988)
- Enameru Taipu Esukisu (エナメルタイプのエスキス, Enamel Sketch) (1989)
- Kurara Sheiku (くららシェイク, Kurara Shake) (1990)

=== As Toshiki Yui ===
- Mermaid Junction (マーメイド・ジャンクション) (1987) (Note: Was adapted into an entry in the Cream Lemon series, Visions of Europe (#20).)
- Tadaima Hāto Konsenchū (ただいまハート混線中, Confusion of the Heart) (1988)
- Umauma (ウマウマ) (1990)
- Misutei Gaaru (ミスティガール, Misty Girl) (1991) (Note: Translated into English as Misty Girl Extreme in 1997.)
- Jankushon (ジャンクション, Junction) (1993) (Note: Was published in English as Hot Tails.) (Incorporated into Hot Tails, Vol. 1)
- Kirara (1993–1997) (Note: Was adapted into an OAV series; only official translation has been into Italian.)
- Hotto Jankushon (ホットジャンクション, Hot Junction) (1993–1994)
- Yui Myūjiamu: Yui Toshiki Shoki Sakuhin Shū (唯ミュージアム 唯登詩樹初期作品集, Yui Museum: The Early Works Collection of Toshiki Yui) (1995)
- Ikenai yo Yūkosan (いけないよゆう子さん, Don't Do It, Yūko-san) (1996)
- Uindingu Pātī (ウィンディングパーティー, Wingding Party) (1990) (Note: Translated into English as Wingding Orgy: Hot Tails Extreme in 1997. Hot Tails was added to the title due to the popularity of Yui's Hot Tails.) (Incorporated into Hot Tails, Vol. 2)
- IT (イット, It) (1999)
- Yui Shop (1999–2003) Kodansha
- Re Yui (2000)
- Toraburu Jemini (とらぶるジェミニ, Trouble Gemini) (2000)
- X2 (2000)
- Princess Quest Saga (2000)
- Kagome Kagome (かごめかごめ) (2000–2001)
- Suna no Kami, Sora no Hito (砂の神 空の人, God of the Sands, People of the Sky) (2002)
- Boku no Futatsu no Tsubasa (ボクのふたつの翼, My Two Wings) (2003–2005)
- Honjitsu no Osusume Pura du Jūru (本日のオススメ プラ・ドゥ・ジュール, Today's Special: Plat du Jour) (2004)
- Mai no Heya (MAI の部屋, Mai's Room) (2006–2008) Kodansha
- H-na (Hな, Perverted, 2008)
- My Sisters (2010)
- Want to Sex (して。。。ほしいの♡ Shite... Hoshii no—lit. I Want to Do It, 2010)
- My Dollhouse (3 volumes, 2010–, status unknown but thought to be either ended or in hiatus)
- Ruri Ruri: Futago no Jijou (るりるり 双子の事情, Ruri Ruri: The Twins' Circumstances, 2012)
- IVNO ユノ (Juno, 2013; IVNO being the Latin spelling)
- あね My Sister+ (2013; a continuation of My Sister, coupled with IVNO ユノ for a tankōbon release)
- Saikin kono sekai wa watashi dake no mono ni narimashita… (最近この世界は私だけのモノになりました… Recently this world became mine only..., 2013–; published in Grand Jump magazine)
