= Gender separation in Judaism =

In Judaism, especially in Orthodox Judaism, there are a number of settings in which men and women are kept separate in order to conform with various elements of the Jewish law halakha and to prevent men and women from mingling.

== Background ==
There are a variety of reasons in Judaism for gender separation.

In Pirkei Avot 1:5, Yosi ben Yochanan says that a man who spends too much time talking to women, even his wife, neglects the study of Torah and will inherit gehinnom (Hell).

Chapter 152 of Kitzur Shulchan Aruch details a series of laws forbidding interaction between persons of the opposite sex who are not married or closely related. Some of the prohibitions include negiah (physical contact), yichud (isolation with members of the opposite sex), staring at women or any of their body parts or attire, or conversation for pleasure.

== By setting ==
=== Synagogues ===
During prayer services in Orthodox synagogues, seating is always separate. A mechitza is used to divide the men and women, and often to block the view from one section to the other. The reason for this is that a man might be distracted during prayer if he spots a beautiful woman. Halakha permits women to look at men in a synagogue during prayer services.

The first mention of a mechitza is in the context of the Second Temple in Jerusalem; the temple contained an inner court and a Women's court. Separation was first instituted just for the once-a-year celebration of the annual "Water-Drawing Ceremony", simḥat beit hashoevah, held on the second night of the autumn Sukkot festival. However, women regularly entered the Beit Hamikdash Holy area at all other times just as any Israelite man could to bring their personal sacrifices.

Scholars have long debated the extent to which gender segregation and a mechitza between the sexes existed in synagogues during the periods of the Second Temple, the Mishnah, and the Talmud. Shmuel Safrai, through a combination of textual analysis and archaeological evidence, has argued that while women consistently attended synagogue services, there is no definitive evidence to support the existence of a partition separating the genders or the existence of a separate women's aid (Ezrat Nashim). The archaeologist Lee Levin agrees with Safrai that not only is there no archaeological evidence for the existence of Ezrat Nashim in ancient synagogues, but there are also many ancient synagogues that have only a single prayer hall, indicating that there was no segregation at all.

Separation of men and women also was established later within the Rabbinic Law, which established daily communal prayers binding to men only, and the central area of the synagogue was only allowed to be occupied by men as well. However, during the early modern period, Moshe Rosman noted that, women began attending synagogue more often, which reflected on the changes to synagogue architecture. Changes that occurred to synagogue architecture included, the construction of the weibershule – separate rooms in which women conducted their own prayers, also ezrat nashim – separate women's section in the synagogue, in which women prayer leaders mediated between the main services and the women's prayers, in a manner again very much determined by the initiatives of women. Today, some more liberal Orthodox congregations have enacted innovations allowing women a greater sense of participation, as long as they remain on their side of the mechitza. Mechitzot are not only found in synagogues during prayer services, but in other aspects of Jewish life such as festivities, like weddings, lectures, concerts, and b'nei mitzvah.

Conservative, Reform and other types of synagogues generally do not have separate seating.

=== Western Wall ===
During the late 19th century, no formal segregation of men and women was to be found at the Western Wall. In recent years, the Western Wall in Jerusalem has become a site of conflict and contention between liberal and feminist Jews. The Western Wall has been defended by the Orthodox faith for generations, which is why many of the traditions have been maintained such as gender segregation. Many Orthodox Jews believe that in order to keep the sanctity of the wall, proper gender roles must be adhered. In the mid-twentieth century, a mechitza was set up at the wall to maintain and enforce gender separation; this caused conflict between the Haredi Jews and the Arabs. The progressives responded to these actions by the Orthodox sector, by claiming that "the Wall is a shrine of all Jews, not one particular branch of Judaism" In 1988, Women of the Wall launched a campaign for recognition of women's right to pray at the Wall in their fashion. Their form and manner of prayer elicited a violent response from some Orthodox worshippers, and they were initially banned from holding services at the site. In response to the repeated arrests of women, including Anat Hoffman, trying to exercise their freedom of religion, the Jewish Agency observed "the urgent need to reach a permanent solution and make the Western Wall once again a symbol of unity among the Jewish people, and not one of discord and strife". The Israeli high court finally affirmed in 2000 the right to have women pray at the wall according to their custom, whether it be Reform, Conservative, or Orthodox. This new law included the right for women to be able to pray aloud, read from the Torah, and wear a tallit; the supreme court also recognized that the wall was "owned" by the Orthodox sector, but felt that women had the right to pray how they wish. After the supreme court ruled upon this, some Haredi Jewish men tried to petition the court to criminalize women who read from the Torah, wore a tallit, or blew shofar at the Wall. In 2003 this petition was looked at by the Israeli court and the court appealed the previously passed bill, the reasoning behind the repeal was because women praying at the wall would be a threat to public safety. The courts decision to once again limit women's rights at the Wall came from a place of fear, that if they did not limit their rights that there would be an uprising by the Haredi sector.

Women of the Wall has also protested the fact that at Hanukkah every year a giant menorah is erected in the men's section of the Western Wall and each night of the eight nights of the festival, male rabbis and male politicians are honored, while women must peer over the mechitzah roughly 10 meters away to view the menorah. At the Women of the Wall ceremony, women brought their personal menorahs. They invited Jews around the world to light a candle for WoW on the third night of Hanukkah. Western Wall rabbi Shmuel Rabinowitz accused WoW of ulterior motives of trying to change the customs at the Wall. Responding to Rabinowitz' accusation, Anat Hoffman noted: "Rabinowitz has never invited Women of the Wall or any other women to participate in the ceremonies or to be honored with the lighting of a candle at the Kotel on Hanukkah, despite the fact that women are obligated equally to men in this religious act.” In 2014 the personal menorahs the women brought to the Kotel were initially confiscated, but they were returned when police were called.

=== Weddings and B’nei Mitzvah ===
At many Orthodox weddings and b’nei mitzvah, seating at the ceremony, and often the reception, is separate, sometimes with a mechitza.

Reform Judaism approaches such ceremonies differently, with seating at the ceremony and reception generally gender neutral. Some communities have replaced gendered bar and bat mitzvahs with gender neutral confirmations ceremonies, in which all those of age at Shabuoth are initiated together, some still practise confirmation along with bar and bat mitzvahs.

=== Swimming ===
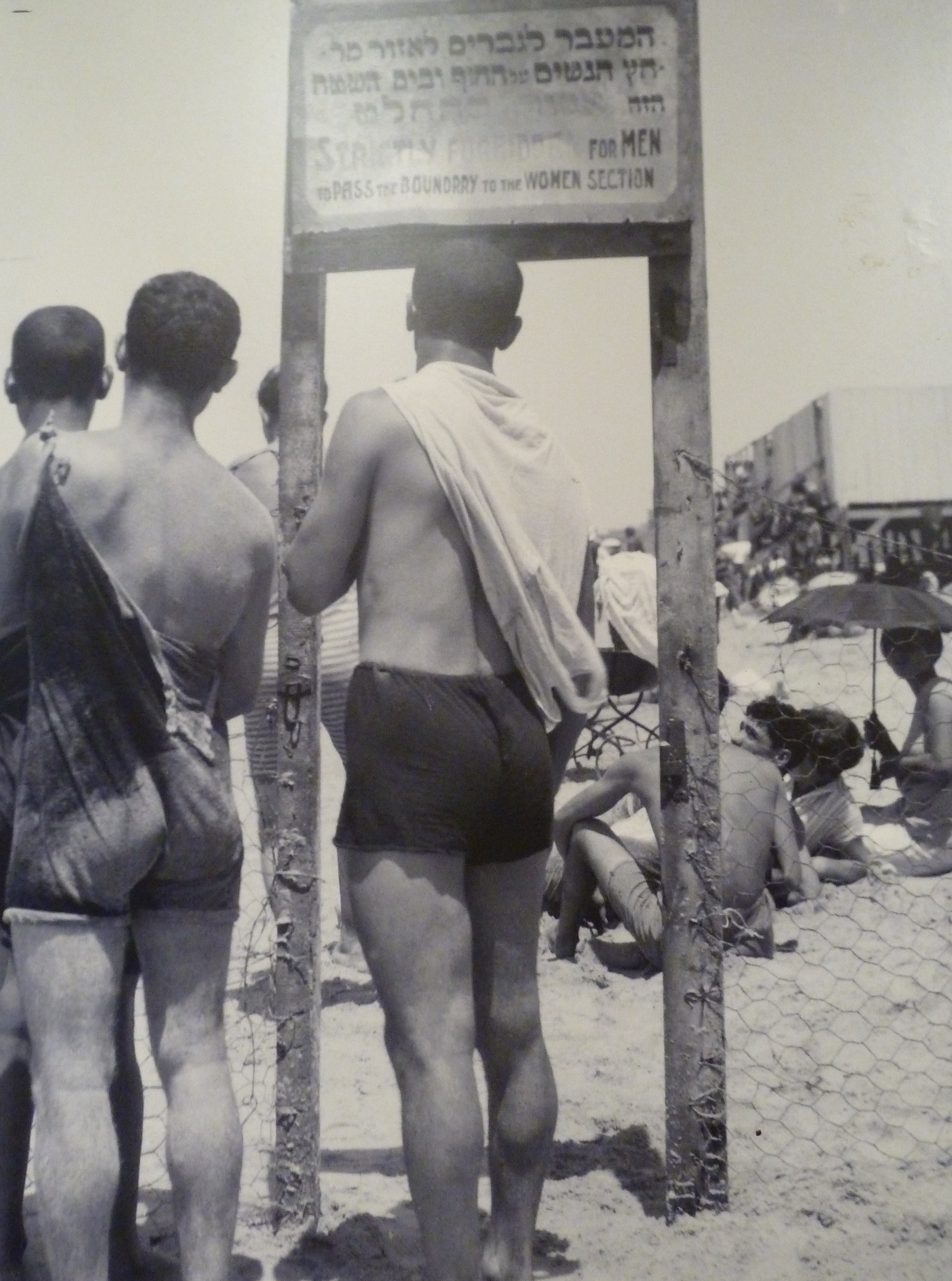
A sign forbidding men entering the women's section a Tel-Aviv beach, 1927

Many Orthodox Jews believe that men and women should not swim together. The laws prohibiting mixed bathing are derived from the laws of tzniut. This is due to concerns that bathing suits are inherently immodest, and do not meet tzniut requirements. In particular, a woman who comes dressed in a bathing suit to a pool is appearing publicly not meeting the requirements of tzniut, and a man who comes to a pool where women are dressed in bathing suits will inevitably see women dressed in this manner. Indeed, many pools within Jewish communities have separate hours for male and female swimming to accommodate those who follow this law.

Women following the laws of tzniut will wear a long T-shirt style dress over their bathing suit that meets tzniut requirements, considering this to be sufficient for swimming in the presence of men. Men, though, are more strict about the presence of immodestly-dressed women, due to concerns over the possibility of arousal.

Conservative, Reform, and other forms of Judaism do not have any restrictions on mixed swimming. Some Modern Orthodox Jews will also participate in mixed swimming.

=== Streets ===
Some Haredi communities enforce, or attempt to enforce, gender segregation on sidewalks. In New Square, New York, signs remain posted telling women to abide by modesty rules, and streets are strictly separated by gender, with women on the opposite side as men. In the Mea Shearim section of Jerusalem, some Haredi Jews have also tried to segregate sidewalks.

=== Parks and athletic facilities ===
At Kiryas Joel, a Hasidic community in New York, a public park was opened that included separate sections for boys and girls, with a great distance between. Rabbi Gedalia Segdin, the town's treasurer, announced the park would be under the scrutiny of the town "Modesty Committee" to ensure gender segregation. Yiddish signs distributed throughout the park made sure everyone kept to their specified section. Civil rights organizations protested gender segregation in a public space in New York, and the American Civil Liberties Union and New York Civil Liberties Union filed a lawsuit against Kiryas Joel. After initially claiming that the park did not exist, Kiryas Joel ultimately settled the suit and agreed not to "endorse" sex-segregation in its public places.

=== Public entertainment ===
Public performances from female singers are discouraged in Haredi communities due to kol isha, the law that men are forbidden from listening to women sing as established in Berakhot 24a of the Talmud. In 2019, the Israeli High Court banned a gender segregated concert from taking place in Afula, but the ruling was too late as the performance was almost over. This was one of hundreds of gender segregated events the city hosted that summer.

In 2012, Haredi radio station Kol Berama was sued by Kolech for violating anti-discrimination laws. The station refused to employ female broadcasters and did not take calls from female listeners.

Orthodox Jews do not participate in mixed dancing, since dancing in most forms involves some contact between dancers.

=== Transportation ===
Some followers of Haredi Judaism have taken on the practice of separate seating while traveling. These range from abstaining from sitting adjacent to a member of the opposite sex, to having separate vehicles altogether.

When Haredi have attempted to enforce gender segregation on public transportation such as buses and airlines, conflict with anti-discrimination laws have sometimes ensued. There have been complaints by airline passengers such as Renee Rabinowitz who have been subjected to Haredi male passengers attempting to impose gender segregation on flights. The New York Times interviewed Anat Hoffman on the phenomenon on Haredi males asking female passengers on airlines to move. IRAC had started a campaign urging women not to give up their seats. El Al airlines has future plans to fly single-gender flights for Haredi Jews following this practice. In 2017, the Jerusalem Magistrates Court ruled that employees of airlines could not request female passengers change their seats just because men wish them to.

During the 1990s, members of the Haredi sector began making requests for public transport services be compatible with what they claimed was the character of their community in Israel. This entailed the segregation of men and women on public transportation such as buses. When this movement first began private transport services emerged and began to cater to Haredi demands. Due to these new bus lines a new committee was instituted in the Ministry of Transportation, led by Nachum Langenthal. The Langenthal committee decided that segregation was to be voluntary, and could be adhered to by the Haredi Jews, but it could not to be enforced on others. Though on city run buses it was not enforced, private buses could enforce these segregation rules. These buses were called mehadrin bus lines.

By 2010, there were approximately fifty public bus services designated as mehadrin; although this represented a small portion of the total public buses, it allowed for tensions to grow between the Haredi community and the rest of the population. Private bus lines were established all across Israel, caused issues to arise especially where such lines were the only viable form of transportation in the area. Mehadrin bus lines became more prevalent in areas that had a high concentration of Haredi communities. Due to the segregation rules, the status of women became a direct issue in the Israeli community. When many of the buses became overcrowded, enforcing the segregation rules became harder, and many of the Haredi men complained about having to touch passengers of the opposite sex.

When the mehadrin buses became more popular, the Israel Women's Network petitioned the Israeli Supreme Court, arguing that the segregation policy on mehadrin lines discriminated against women. The court denied the application on the grounds that the gender segregation on buses was supported by the religious community and should be respected. After the denial Haredi men known as "modesty guards" began to appear on buses attempting to enforce the segregation rules themselves. In some cases women were forced off the bus or subjected to physical or verbal abuse when not appropriately dressed or when sitting near the front of the bus. Although a myriad of protests occurred to stop the segregation, it was defended by many, including rabbinic leaders and some members of the Haredi community, as intrinsic to the Haredi way of life.

=== Halakhic language ===
According to Ruth Halperin-Kaddari, the language of Jewish law seems to involve gender separation. Her theory stems from the fact that the Hebrew language is inherently gendered and one can speak either in the masculine or feminine form, and that the Halakha has almost always been written in the masculine. This has led to the impression that Jewish law addresses only men, leaving no room for women within the Halakhic discourse. According to Halperin-Kaddari, this separation, which occurred almost incidentally, deeply affects the place of women within the Halakha and their ability to influence and change it. Halperin-Kaddari does not suggest altering the language of Jewish law but advocates for working within it, prioritizing interpretations that include women over those that exclude them.

== See also ==
- Gender and Judaism
- Women in Israel
- Women of the Wall
- Islam and gender segregation
