= Saris (Judaism) =

Jewish term

In Jewish tradition, the term saris (Hebrew: סָרִיס, literally eunuch) is a term used to refer to an individual assigned male at birth who has done one of the following:

- developed female characteristics;
- failed to reach sexual maturity by 20 years old, signified by bringing forth two pubic hairs;
- undergone castration.

In traditional Judaism, gender plays a central role in legal obligations, such as mitzvah. Thus, the gender identities of the Talmud (including androgynos, tumtum, and ay'lonit) were created to fit into their legal system.

A saris who, naturally, did not undergo typical male puberty is referred to as saris hamah (Hebrew: סריס חמה ). Those affected by human intervention (whether accidental or intentional) are referred to as saris adam (Hebrew: סריס אדם). While it may have been a common practice in neighboring cultures, the Ancient Hebrews did not practice castration.

== References in holy texts ==
=== Examples ===
And let not the saris say: “I am a withered tree” For thus says God: As for the sarises who keep My sabbaths, [...] I will give them an everlasting name that shall not perish. — Isaiah 56:3-5

== Marriage ==
While an ay'lonit can be married, the views on saris are more complicated. If they are born a saris hamah, they may marry without restrictions. However, if they are a saris adam, they cannot marry a Jewish woman, as there is a belief their wives may commit adultery as a consequence of the saris adam's infertility. In addition, if a saris adam was married prior to castration, they are required to divorce their wife.
