= Futanari =

Japanese word and pornographic genre

Futanari (ふたなり; seldom: 二形, 双形, literally: dual form; 二成, 双成, literally: "[to be of] two kinds") is the Japanese word for hermaphroditism, which is also used in a broader sense for androgyny.

Beyond Japan, the term has come to be used to describe a commonly pornographic genre of eroge, manga, and anime, which includes characters that show primary sexual characteristics from both females and males. In today's language, it refers almost exclusively to characters who have a gynomorph-female or overall feminine body, but have both female and male primary genitalia (although a scrotum is not always present, while breasts, a penis, and a vulva are). In rare cases of otokofutanari, instead of a woman, it's a andromorphic-male or overall masculine body, with a penis, a vagina, and muscles instead of breasts. In gyaku-futanari ("reverse"-futanari), instead of replacing a woman's vagina with a penis, replace a man's penis with a vagina (this never counts as a hermaphrodite; in English, analogous term for it is "cuntboy"). The term is also often abbreviated as futa(s), which is also used as a generalized term for the works themselves.

== Historic origins ==
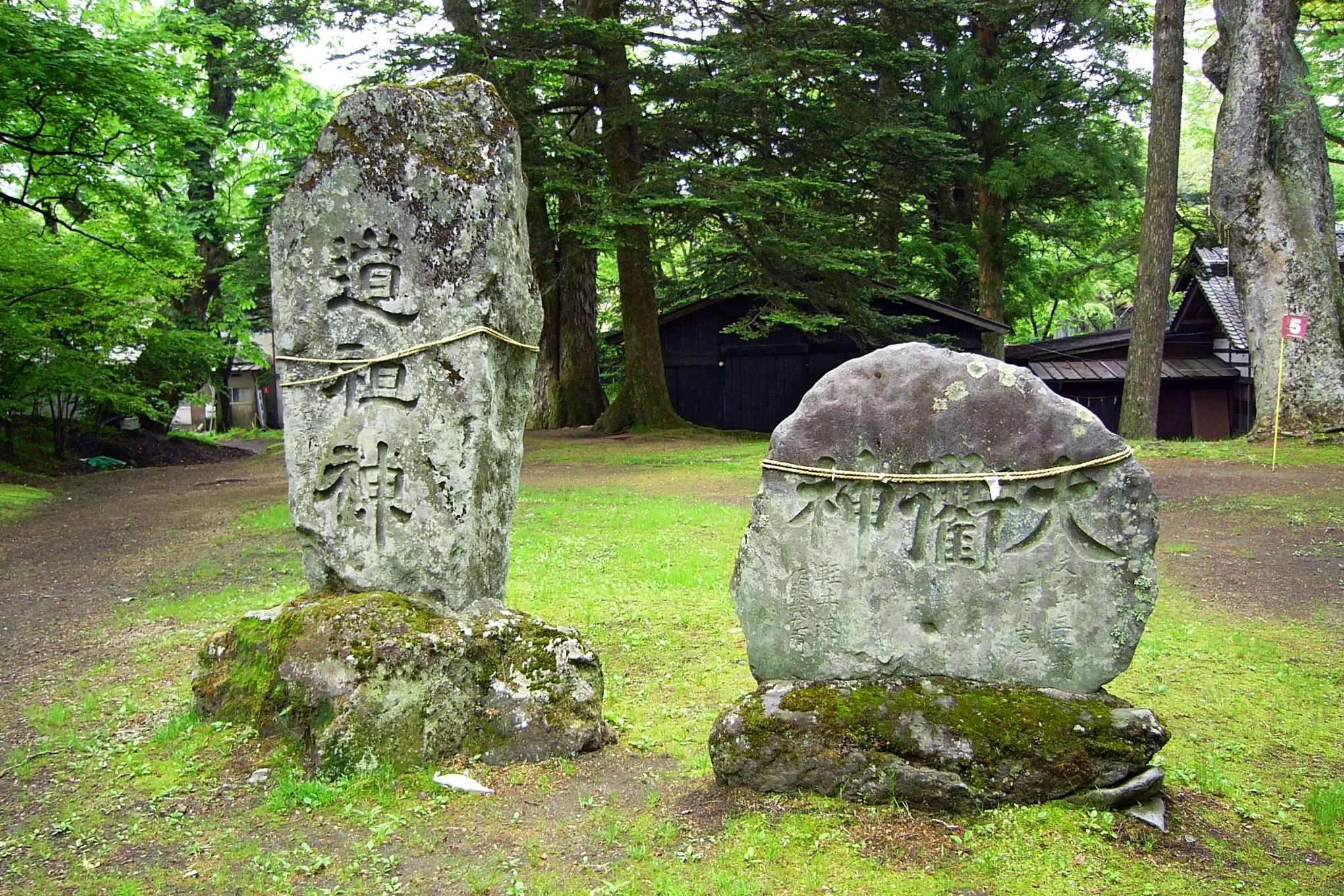
Stones with shimenawa representing dōsojin, near Karuizawa, Nagano

The most accredited etymology of the word comes from an emakimono, a type of painted hand scroll, titled 'Scroll of Disease and Deformities' (病草紙, Yamai no Sōshi), drawn between the Heian and the Kamakura periods. It contains several depictions of individuals who exhibit traits characteristic of both male and female genitalia. The word futanari is used in the passage, "You shall see how they possess both male and female roots. Truly, they are of both forms/kinds/or aspects (futanari)."

Japanese folk religion created diverse fantasies related to sexual characteristics. Traditional vocal pieces that date back hundreds of years deliver rough evidence that a change of gender was not ruled out, and that the representation of the gender was used to worship deities such as dōsojin, which sometimes had ambiguous gender, being neither male nor female. Gary Leupp adds that the origins may even extend back to the origins of Buddhism, since the deities would not necessarily have a fixed or determinate gender.

Likewise, the belief spread that some people could change their gender depending on the lunar phase. The term half-moon (半月, hangetsu) was coined to describe such beings. Japanese clothing, which made distinguishing men from women more difficult than in other cultures, presumably might have had an influence on this development. To restrict women from accessing prohibited areas and to avoid smuggling by hiding items in the belt bag, guard posts were assigned to perform body checks. Historical records indicate that guards frequently joked about this matter, resulting in various stories and even poems. Whether anatomical anomalies, such as clitoromegaly or unusual physical development, led to these assumptions remains an open question.

Until 1644, when onnagata actors were required to adopt male hairstyles regardless of the gender they were portraying, actors playing female warriors capitalized on interest in the futanari quality, which was common in both samurai and commoner society.

== In anime and manga ==
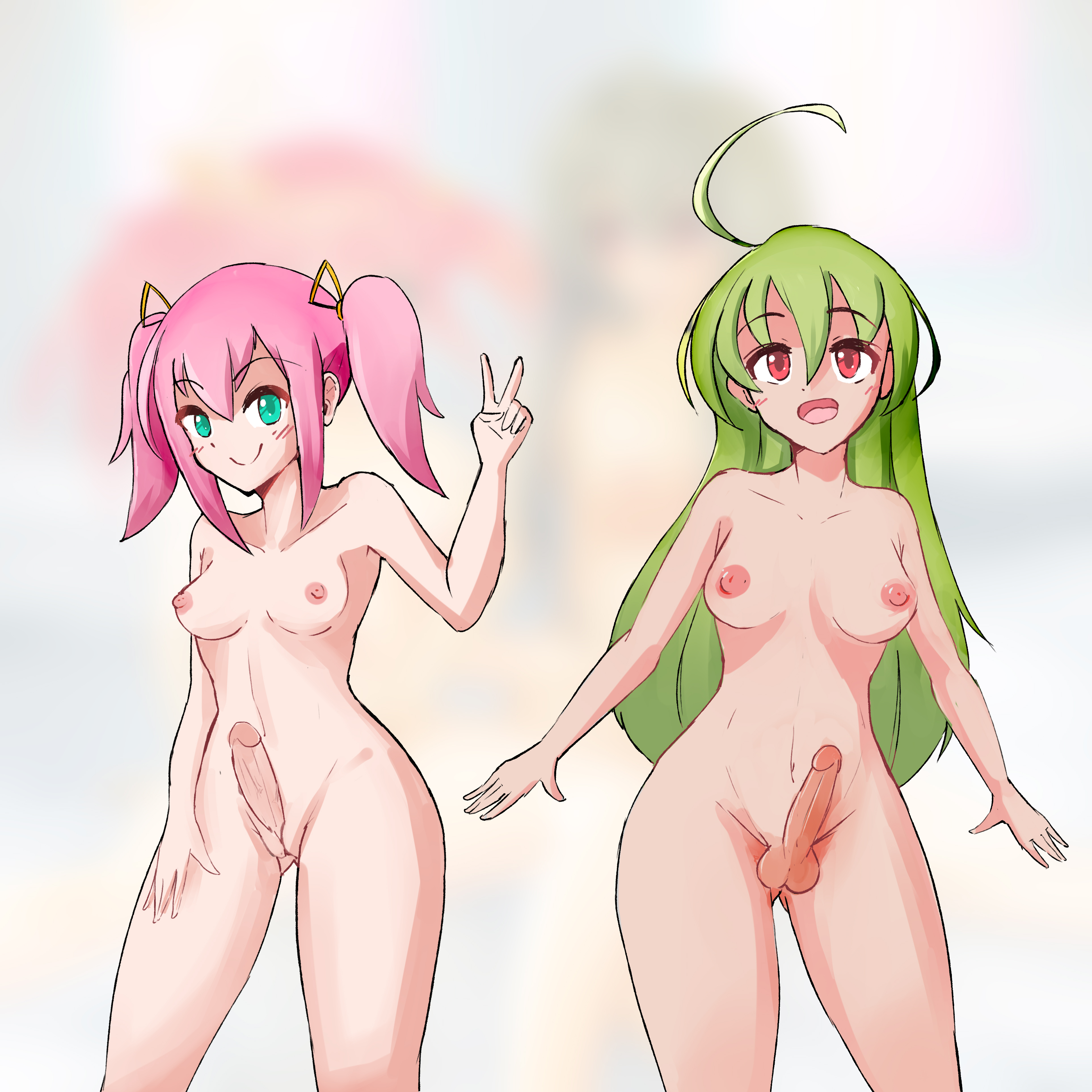
Illustration of two futanari variants: one with a scrotum (right) and one without (left), both with breasts, a penis, and a vulva

Originally, the Japanese language referred to any character or real person that possessed masculine and feminine traits as futanari. This changed in the 1990s, as drawn futanari characters became more popular in anime and manga. Today, the term commonly refers to fictional hermaphroditic female characters. Futanari is also used as the term for a specific genre within hentai-related media (pornographic anime or manga) that depicts such characters.

=== Origins ===
Futanari manga became popular in the 1990s and quickly became a part of the industry, cross-pollinating with multiple genres. Toshiki Yui's Hot Tails is a well-known example of the genre in the West.

== See also ==
- Agdistis
- Ardhanarishvara
- Hermaphroditus
- Rebis
- Intersex
- Pseudo-penis
- Ovotesticular syndrome
- Fetishization of LGBTQ people
- Yaoi hole, comparable phenomenon in gay male pornography
