= Gynomorph =

Organism with female traits

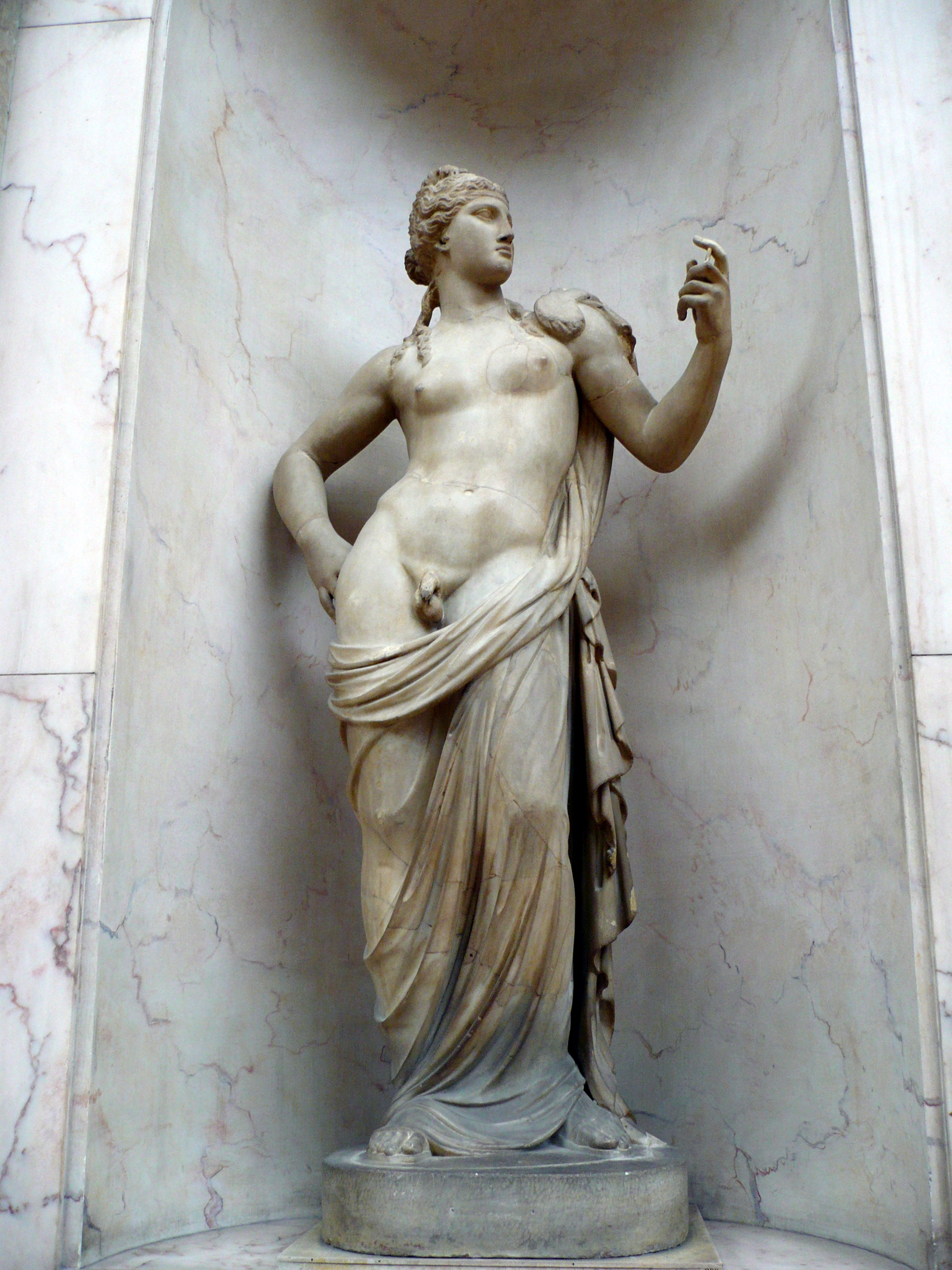
A gynomorphic sculpture of Bacchus, Roman Imperial (2nd century CE), at the Musée du Louvre.

Gynomorph is a word used to describe an organism with female physical characteristics.

== Mythology ==
In Greek mythology and religion, a gynomorph was an androgynous deity with both masculine and feminine characteristics. Gynomorphs were portrayed as effeminate young males, like Dionysos, a masculine god who possessed distinctly feminine features. Gynomorphs retained the creative capacity of female divinities: they had cosmic wombs, but they also possessed the inseminating abilities attributed to male divinities.

== Biology ==
In biology, a gynomorph is an organism with female physical characteristics, whereas an andromorph is an organism with male physical characteristics. For instance, some female damselflies show colour variations typically found in males. Andromorphs, by resembling males, are thought to benefit from avoiding male harassment. Some authors have proposed that this benefit is offset by a higher probability of detection for andromorphs compared to gynomorphs owing to differences in body colouration.

== See also ==
- Androgyny
- Futanari
- Gynandromorphism
- Hermaphrodite
- Oyamakui no Kami
- Sexual dimorphism
- Shemale
