= Ayelonit =

Jewish DSD Classification

In Rabbinic Judaism, an ayelonit (Hebrew: איילונית "ram-like woman", Hebrew pronunciation: [a.je.loˈnit]) is an individual assumed to be female at birth who later developed male secondary sex characteristics and is assumed to be infertile.

The secondary-sex characteristics referred to as "male" can include a deeper voice, painful intercourse, small breasts, a lack of pubic hair, no menstruation, and a diminished libido according to Maimonides' Mishneh Torah, Hil. Ishus, 2:6.

In traditional Judaism, gender plays a central role in legal obligations (see tractate Kiddushin 33b.). Thus, the archaic gender-sexual identities identified by the Talmud such as ayelonit, androgynos, tumtum, and saris, were created to fit into the legal system or halakha and do not correspond well to the current understandings of gender identity.

== Biological basis ==
The ay'lonit is not simply infertile. Based on the "male characteristics" described in the Talmud, the ay'lonit's condition is most similar to Turner syndrome:

- A genetic abnormality in which a woman is partially or entirely missing one of their X chromosomes
- Occurs in 1 out of 2,000-4,000 female births (only found in females)
- Symptoms include: Infertility problems, webbed neck, short stature, metabolic issues, and delayed/absent sexual developments

== References in holy texts ==
There are about 80 references in the Mishnah and Talmud and 40 in classical Midrash and Jewish law codes.

=== Examples ===
"A woman who is twenty years old and has not grown two pubic hairs... is classified as an Aylonit..." (tractate Niddah, Chapter 5, 47b)

"These are the signs that a woman is an ayelonit: She has not developed breasts, she has difficulty during sexual intercourse [that is, she has a diminished libido], the mons pubis is lacking, and she has such a deep voice that it is indistinguishable from that of a man." (Mishneh Torah, Hil. Ishus, 2:6)

"Rav Naḥman said that Rabba bar Avuh said: Our mother Sarah was initially a sexually underdeveloped woman [ayelonit], as it is stated: “And Sarah was barren; she had no child” (Genesis 11:30). The superfluous words: “She had no child,” indicate that she did not have even a place, i.e., a womb, for a child." (Yevamot 64b:2)

== Distinction from saris ==
The ayelonit refers to a person born female who later develops male characteristics. A saris (a term derived from the Akkadian term for a eunuch) was male at birth but later developed female characteristics. This can occur naturally (called saris hama) or through medical interventions (called saris adam). Though an ayelonit can be adam through the removal of their uterus or ovaries, it is more common for them to be hama.

The ayelonit and the saris also differ in their abilities to marry. While an ayelonit can marry, a saris has varying options. If he is saris hama, he can marry without restrictions because he was born that way. If he is saris adam, he cannot marry a Jewish woman because he cannot have children, and this could lead her to adultery according to Yevamot 76a:1. Additionally, if a saris adam was already married, he is required to divorce his wife.
