= Intersex people and religion =

Intersex people are born with sex characteristics, such as chromosomes, gonads, or genitals and secondary sex characteristics that, according to the UN Office of the High Commissioner for Human Rights, "do not fit typical binary notions of male or female bodies".

Intersex people were historically termed hermaphrodites, "congenital eunuchs", or even congenitally "frigid". Such terms have fallen out of favor, now considered to be misleading and stigmatizing. Intersex people have been treated in different ways by different religions and cultures, and numerous historical accounts exist.

== Judaism ==
The Talmud contains extensive discussion concerning the status of two intersex types in Jewish law; namely the androginus, which exhibits both male and female external sexual organs, and the tumtum which exhibits neither. The nature of the androgynous is a topic first expanded upon explicitly in the Mishna, where debate arises as to the individual’s classification as either male or female. The Talmud discusses it primarily in two places, in Tractate Bikkurim and in Tractate Yevamot. One opinion in Tractate Bikkurim indicates that the androgynos has elements of the male, elements of the female, elements of both, and elements of neither. The other opinion insists that the androgynos is its own sex—a category unto itself. Yevamot conducts a much lengthier analysis, where a variety of different approaches are considered in light of the opinions established in Bikkurim. In these discussions, the Talmudic personalities delineate four theoretical categories into which the androgynos may fall:

- The sex of the individual is unknown. They may be male or may be female, but their true identity remains in doubt.
- They are their own sex, a category unto themselves completely separate from the male and female sexes.
- They are both male and female, that is, they exist simultaneously as a member of both sexes.
- They are considered male. Because they possess male sexual characteristics, they belong to the male sex.

Jewish Law has specific legal obligation that differ for men and women, and thus gender becomes an exceedingly important aspect of one’s identity.

When determining the legal gender of androgynos individuals, a minority of Jewish Law decisors, “posek”, classify androgynos individuals as completely male. Therefore, androgynos individuals would be obligated by law in the same way as men. However, the majority of Talmudic commentators and Jewish Law decisors do not assign androgynos individuals a fixed gender, and instead leave them in a status of doubtful identity. Because of the androgynos person’s uncertain identity, they can be classified differently in varying cases—sometimes male, sometimes female, sometimes both male and female, and other times neither. The legal ramifications of such an attitude forces the individual to adhere to Jewish law as both a male and female. According to this classification, in cases where the law differs for men and women, androgynos individuals must adhere to the stricter option. For example, time-bound positive mitzvot (commandments) that men are obligated to keep and women are exempted, androgynos individuals must keep the obligation. Those who classify an androgynos individual as definitively both male and female would agree with this principle, though practice may differ in certain cases. The difference between classifying an androgynos individual as only male or as a doubtful identity would manifest itself in a case where performing a commandment would also require a blessing in conjunction. According to those who maintain that an androgynos has an uncertain sex, the individual would not recite the blessing. This is because the only men may recite this blessing, and if the individual is not a man, they would be reciting the blessing in vain. However, according to the opinions who maintain that the individual is fully male, then they would recite the blessing as any other male would.

== Christianity ==
Eunuchs are mentioned many times in the Bible, such as in the Book of Isaiah (56:4) using the word סריס (saris). Matthew establishes that the term refers to some individuals from birth, as well as individuals made eunuchs through castration:

For there are some eunuchs, which were so born from their mother's womb: and there are some eunuchs, which were made eunuchs of men: and there be eunuchs, which have made themselves eunuchs for the kingdom of heaven's sake. He that is able to receive it, let him receive it.

— Matthew 19:12

The reference to "eunuchs" in Matthew 19:12 has yielded various interpretations.

Roman law and post-classical Canon law referred to a person's sex as male, female or hermaphrodite, with legal rights as male or female depending on the characteristics that appeared most dominant. Under Roman law, a hermaphrodite had to be classed as either male or female.

The 12th-century Decretum Gratiani states that "Whether an hermaphrodite may witness a testament, depends on which sex prevails". According to Raming, Macy and Cook, the Canon lawyer Huguccio states that, "If someone has a beard, and always wishes to act like a man (excercere virilia) and not like a female, and always wishes to keep company with men and not with women, it is a sign that the male sex prevails in him and then he is able to be a witness, where a woman is not allowed". On ordination, Raming, Macy and Cook found that the Decretum Gratiani states, "item Hermafroditus. If therefore the person is drawn to the feminine more than the male, the person does not receive the order. If the reverse, the person is able to receive but ought not to be ordained on account of deformity and monstrosity."

On August 29, 2017, the evangelical Council on Biblical Manhood and Womanhood in the United States released a manifesto on human sexuality known as the "Nashville Statement". The statement states in part, "WE AFFIRM that the differences between male and female reproductive structures are integral to God’s design for self-conception as male or female. WE DENY that physical anomalies or psychological conditions nullify the God-appointed link between biological sex and self-conception as male or female" and, "WE AFFIRM that those born with a physical disorder of sex development are created in the image of God and have dignity and worth equal to all other image-bearers. They are acknowledged by our Lord Jesus in his words about “eunuchs who were born that way from their mother’s womb.” With all others they are welcome as faithful followers of Jesus Christ and should embrace their biological sex insofar as it may be known. WE DENY that ambiguities related to a person’s biological sex render one incapable of living a fruitful life in joyful obedience to Christ." Due to perceived homophobia, transphobia, and misogyny, the Nashville Statement has attracted controversy.

=== Latter Day Saints ===
Mormonism's largest denomination, the Church of Jesus Christ of Latter-day Saints (LDS Church), issued policies for intersex individuals for the first time in 2020. The new policies stated that for persons born intersex, the decision to determine a child's sex should be left to the parents, with the guidance of medical professionals, and that such decisions can be made at birth or delayed until medically necessary.

== Islam ==
Scholars of Islamic jurisprudence have detailed discussions on the status and rights of intersex people based on what mainly exhibits in their external sexual organs. The intersex rights includes rights of inheritance, rights to marriage, and rights to live like any other male or female. The legal interest in an otherwise statistically rare biological phenomenon bears correspondence to the Talmudic discussions of Intersex persons (different in content from Islamic teachings).

An intersex person is called a Khunthaa in the books of Fiqh. Intersex medical interventions are considered permissible to achieve agreement between a person’s exterior, chromosomal make-up or sex organs.

== Anitism ==
Lakapati is a hermaphrodite and a major fertility deity in the Tagalog religion. Her prowess on fertility covers not only human and divine fertility, but also the fertility of all other things such as wildlife, crops, trees, and plants. She is also the goddess of cultivated land. A prayer dedicated to Lakapati was recited by children when sowing seeds: "Lakapati, pakanin mo yaring alipin mo; huwag mong gutumin (Lakapati, feed this thy slave; let him not hunger)". Prominent among deities who received full-blown sacrifices, Lakapati is represented by a hermaphrodite image with both male and female parts and was worshiped in the fields at planting time.

== Hinduism ==
Sangam literature uses the word pedi (Tamil: பேடி pēṭi) to refer to people born with an intersex condition; it also refers to antharlinga hijras and various other hijras. Intersex people are popularly known as Mabedi Usili in Hijra community but their identity always remained as a distinct identity from popular hijra community. In Tirumantiram, Tirumular recorded the relationship between intersex people and Shiva. Warne and Raza argue that an association between intersex and hijra people is mostly unfounded, but popular misunderstandings "cause tremendous fear in the parents" of intersex infants and children.

== Hermeticism ==
In Hermeticism the Rebis is sometimes called the "Divine Hermaphrodite".

== See also ==
- Intersex
- Intersex in history
- Third gender
