= Tumtum (Judaism) =

Person whose sex is unknown in Judaism

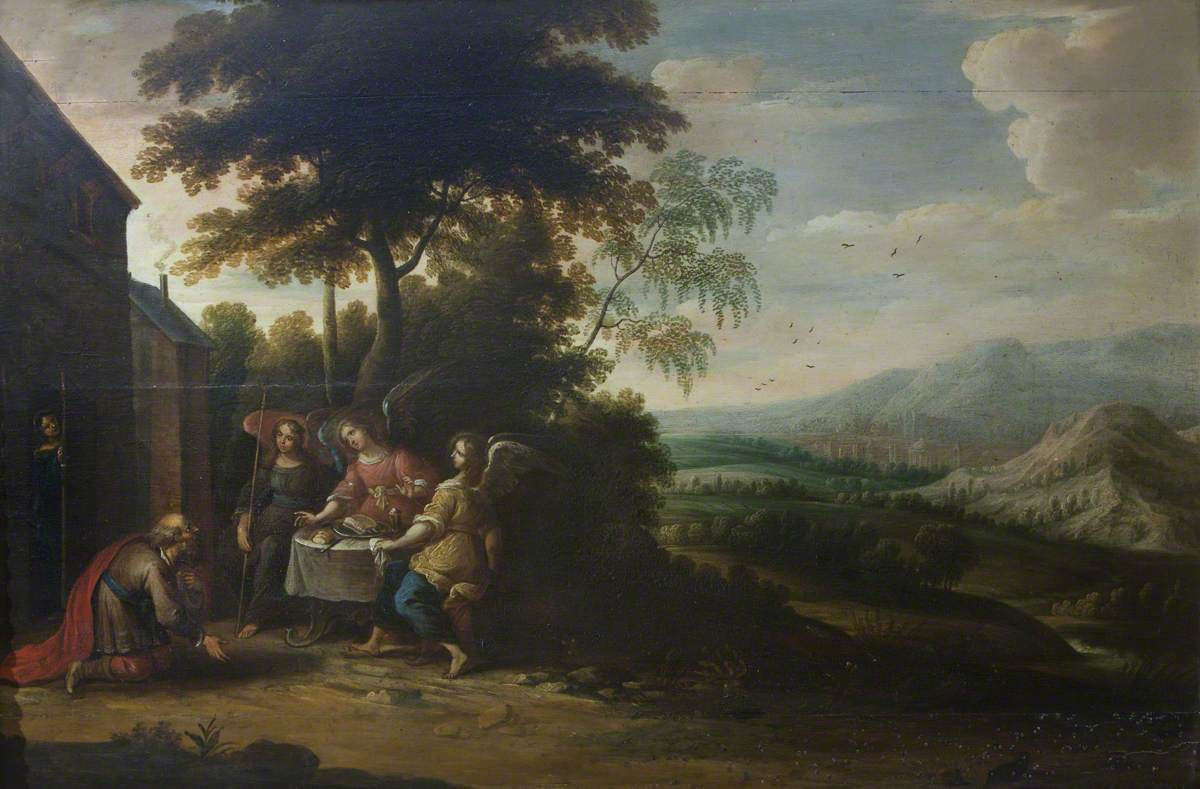
Abraham and Sarah visited by Three Angels, painted between 1581 and 1642 CE. According to the Talmud, both Abraham and Sarah were born tumtum.

Tumtum (Hebrew: טומטום, "hidden") is a term that appears in Jewish Rabbinic literature. It usually refers to a person whose sex is unknown because their genitalia are hidden, undeveloped, or difficult to determine.

Although they are often grouped together, the tumtum has some halakhic ramifications distinct from those of the androgynos (אנדרוגינוס), who have both male and female genitalia.

Although tumtum does not appear in the Scripture, it does in other literature. Reform rabbi Elliot Kukla writes, "The tumtum appears 17 times in the Mishna; 23 times in the Tosefta; 119 times in the Babylonian Talmud; 22 times in the Jerusalem Talmud; and hundreds of times in midrash, commentaries, and halacha."

In the Babylonian Talmud Yevamot 64a–b, Rabbi Ammi says that the Biblical figures "Abraham and Sarah were originally tumtumim" and infertile and then miraculously turned into a fertile husband and wife in their old age. Rabbi Ammi points to the Book of Isaiah 51:1–2, saying that the references to "Look to the rock from where you were hewn, and to the hole of the pit from where you were dug [...] Look to Abraham your father and to Sarah who bore you" explains their genitals being uncovered and remade.

== Etymology ==
The eleventh century dictionary, the Aruch, says the word tumtum came from atum (אטום) "sealed".

== Physical characteristics ==
The classical description of the physical characteristic of tumtum says they have a membrane of skin hiding female or male genitals. One form of a tumtum has exposed testicles and an unexposed penis. As long as the skin covers their genitals, they are considered doubtful men and women. As long as the skin is present, they are not able to be circumcised or have sex. Their status as tumtum can be changed by surgery, though they will still always have different rights and duties than those of other men and women. In the Talmud, one adult tumtum from the town of Bairi had surgery to cut away this skin, so he was able to be re-categorized as a man. He later fathered seven children. Rabbis differ in whether tumtum are legally obligated to have that surgery.

This description does not exactly match any intersex condition known today.

== Gender role ==
Scholars today differ in whether they see tumtum as a distinct gender. The second-century CE Mishnah, the oldest compendium of the Oral Torah, brings the opinion of Rabbi Meir that tumtum is not a distinct gender but a state of doubt between male and female: "Sometimes he is a man, and sometimes he is a woman." This is the position of traditional Judaism. According to transgender Reform rabbi Elliot Kukla tumtum is one of six genders in classical Judaism, along with male, female, androgynos, ayelonit (a person who was assigned female at birth but is barren and perhaps masculinized), and saris (a eunuch by birth either through human intervention, or a person who was assigned male at birth but later became feminized). This, he claims, is an example of how the Western gender binary is not universal to all cultures.

Although the definition of tumtum is based on physical characteristics, this is used as a basis for social roles, duties, and prohibitions. This can be considered effectively a gender role. The strictest gender-dependent obligations or prohibitions apply to tumtum because if the tumtum might genuinely be a man or woman, laws for neither men nor women should be broken. Positive commandments from which women are exempt are considered binding on a tumtum. In Tractate Zavim 2, the compiler of the Mishnah says that tumtum and androgynos have both men's and women's khumrot, meaning that where the law is stricter towards men than women, they are treated as men. Still, where the law is more stringent towards women, they are treated as women.

== See also ==
- Androgynos (Judaism)
- Gender and Judaism
- Intersex people and religion
- Intersex people in history
