= Kirara (manga) =

Manga series by Toshiki Yui

- Kirara Cover (Volume 6)
- Manga
- Written by: Toshiki Yui
- Published by: Shueisha
- English publisher: JManga (online)
- Magazine: Weekly Young Jump
- Original run: 1993 – 1997
- Volumes: 6
- Original video animation
- Directed by: Kiyoshi Murayama
- Studio: Ashi Productions; Toho
- Released: September 21, 2000
- Runtime: 30 minutes

Kirara is a manga character by Toshiki Yui first published by Shueisha. It was later adapted as original video animation (OVA).

It was licensed in French by Panini Comics.

== Plot ==
Kirara Imai is a young woman who, running late for her wedding, speeds in her car and dies in a car accident. Without understanding why, she finds herself transported eight years into the past, as a ghost. Kirara keeps her appearance, but can move through the air and can pass through walls at will. Kirara finds Kompei, her future fiancé, and the Kirara of that time, who at that point are not a couple yet. The ghost Kirara cannot accept her separation from Kompei and tries to keep him to herself, at the expense of her past self.

== Reception ==
In the French Dico Manga, Nicolas Finet described Kirara as a comedy of manners, full of light and uplifting situations, and of misunderstanding and entanglements. He added that its distinct undressed dimension was certainly a part of this works' commercial success in Japan. M. Natali commented in Bd Gest' that the art as well as the layout is in the usual vein of this kind of shōnen with the readers' attention obviously and mostly focused on fanservice in the form of close shots on underwear and buxom busts that populate the pages but regretted the lack of sensuality. The review concluded as a title far from unforgettable but pleasant with a zesty naughtiness.

Mario Vuk found the first volume of the manga reminiscent of Tenchi Muyo!, with a "simpler and more fluid" storytelling style.
