= Personal Attributes Questionnaire =

Questionnaire used for identifying personal attributes

The Personal Attributes Questionnaire (PAQ) is a personality test measuring two scales: "Instrumentality" and "Expressivity", commonly taken to be masculinity and femininity, respectively. It is one of the most commonly used measures of gender identity, second only to the Bem Sex-Role Inventory.

The PAQ was first developed by Janet T. Spence, Robert Helmreich, and Joy Stapp in 1975.

The PAQ has 24 bipolar items rated on a 5-point scale (e.g. item 1: "Not at all aggressive" to "Very aggressive"). The items are scored together to yield three scores: instrumentality (masculinity), expressivity (femininity) and androgyny (masculinity-femininity). The third scale is not used much.
