= Androgynos (Judaism) =

Someone who possesses both male and female sexual characteristics

In Jewish tradition, the term androgynos (Hebrew: אַנְדְּרוֹגִינוֹס, romanized: ʾandərôg̲înôs, lit. 'man-woman,' 'intersex') refers to someone who possesses both male and female sexual characteristics. Due to the ambiguous nature of the individual's sex, Rabbinic literature discusses the sex of the individual and the legal ramifications that result based on potential sex classifications. In traditionally observant Judaism, sex plays a central role in legal obligations.

== Biological basis ==
During the development of the embryo into a fetus, a specific process occurs that determines the physiological properties of the fetus. In other words, there is a point in time where the fetus exists without male or female genitalia. Eventually, due to the release of hormones in one part of the fetus and the recognition of these hormones in another, the fetus either develops male genitalia or female genitalia. This process occurs roughly a month and a half after conception, and occurs completely separately from genetic sex. Genetic sex is determined solely by the presence or absence of the Sex-Determining-Region of the Y chromosome (presence = male, absence = female).

== Distinction from tumtum ==
As explained above, the Jewish androgynos refers specifically to an individual who outwardly appears to have both male and female genitals. A similar though distinct category exists, called a tumtum (טומטום in Hebrew, meaning "hidden"). Maimonides explains that a tumtum is an individual "in whom neither masculine or feminine [genitalia] are discernible." In this way, it is the opposite of the androgynos—where the androgynos has both sets of genitals, the tumtum's genitals cannot be clearly seen. Importantly, Jewish tradition does not view a tumtum in the same way as an androgynos. While the identity of an androgynos is acknowledged to be ambiguous, a tumtum is declared to have a specific sex that is merely hidden externally. Nonetheless, legal authorities within Judaism have continued to debate the status of the tumtum in much the same way as they have debated the status of the androgynos.

== Early references in Jewish literature ==
This is mentioned in the Jewish midrash, the idea of the androgynos is brought up in Genesis Rabbah, a Jewish commentary on the Bible written sometime between 300 CE and 500 CE. The commentator asserts that Adam, in the story of Creation, was created by God as an androgynos. It continues to say that later, when Eve was fashioned from his rib, God separated out the sexes, assigning Adam as male and Eve as female. While there are commentators who disagree with this approach of Genesis Rabbah, the explanation has become a well-known and respected theory within Jewish Biblical interpretation. The widely studied commentator Rashi is one notable example of a personality who adopted this approach.

== Talmudic discourse and theoretical classification ==
The nature of the androgynos is a topic first expanded upon explicitly in the Mishna, where debate arises as to the individual's classification as either male or female. The Talmud discusses it primarily in two places, in Tractate Bikkurim and in Tractate Yevamot. One opinion in Tractate Bikkurim indicates that the androgynos has elements of the male, elements of the female, elements of both, and elements of neither. The other opinion insists that the androgynos is its own sex—a category unto itself. Yevamot conducts a much lengthier analysis, where a variety of different approaches are considered in light of the opinions established in Bikkurim. In these discussions, the Talmudic personalities delineate four theoretical categories into which the androgynos may fall:

- The sex of the individual is unknown. They may be male or may be female, but their true identity remains in doubt.
- They are their own sex, a category unto themselves completely separate from the male and female sexes.
- They are both male and female, that is, they exist simultaneously as a member of both sexes.
- They are considered male. Because they possess male sexual characteristics, they belong to the male sex.

Jewish law has specific legal obligations that differ for men and women, and thus gender becomes an exceedingly important aspect of one's identity.

=== Legal classification ===
When determining the legal gender of androgynos individuals, a minority of Jewish law decisors, "posek", classify androgynos individuals as completely male. Therefore, androgynos individuals would be obligated by law in the same way as men. However, the majority of Talmudic commentators and Jewish law decisors do not assign androgynos individuals a fixed "sex", and instead leave them in a status of doubtful identity. Because of the androgynos person's uncertain identity, they can be classified differently in varying cases—sometimes male, sometimes female, sometimes both male and female, and other times neither. The legal ramifications of such an attitude forces the individual to adhere to Jewish law as both a male and female. According to this classification, in cases where the law differs for men and women, androgynos individuals must adhere to the stricter option. For example, time-bound positive mitzvot (commandments) that men are obligated to keep and women are exempted, androgynos individuals must keep the obligation. Those who classify an androgynos individual as definitively both male and female would agree with this principle, though practice may differ in certain cases. The difference between classifying an androgynos individual as only male or as a doubtful identity would manifest itself in a case where performing a commandment would also require a blessing in conjunction. According to those who maintain that an androgynos has an uncertain sex, the individual would not recite the blessing. This is because the only men may recite this blessing, and if the individual isn't a man, they would be reciting the blessing in vain. However, according to the opinions who maintain that the individual is fully male, then they would recite the blessing as any other male would.

== Sex reassignment surgery ==
There is a contemporary debate between modern halachic (Jewish Law) decisors surrounding the appropriate course of action for someone who presents both sexual characteristics. Rabbi Moishe Sternbuch (born 1926) writes that an individual with ambiguous genitalia should always undergo surgery to become male. The one exception to this rule is if the individual has evident female genitalia who also has extra external structures. Nonetheless, it is universally agreed within Orthodox Judaism that a person with a clear phenotypical gender may not voluntarily undergo sex reassignment surgery.

Rabbi Eliezer Waldenberg (1915–2006), author of the book Tzitz Eliezer, contends that generally, gender is solely dependent on external anatomy. And thus, even if one has the internal characteristics or chromosomal conformation of one sex yet exhibits the genitalia of the other sex, their sex follows their external anatomy. In a case of true androgyny, i.e. where the individual has both male and female genitalia, the person should be turned male. According to Rabbi Waldenberg, because men are obligated to perform more commandments than women, becoming male allows the person to perform more mitzvot than they would be able to do if they were female. In contrast to Rabbi Moishe Sternbuch, Rabbi Waldenberg also permits an androgynous individual who would be truly female following surgery (determined by medical scans/genetic tests) to undergo surgery to become externally female.

== See also ==
- Androgynos (mythology)
- Intersex people and religion
- Tumtum (Judaism)
