= Metts =

Metts is a surname. Notable people with the surname include:

- Harold Metts (born 1947), American politician
- Sandra Metts, American communication scholar
- W. F. Metts (1905–1993), American football coach

== See also ==
- Mette
