= David M. Markowitz =

American communication professor

David M. Markowitz is a communication professor at Michigan State University who specializes in the study of language and deception. Much of his work focuses on how technological channels (e.g., social media) impact the encoding and decoding of messages. His work has captured the attention of magazines and outlets in popular culture; he writes articles for Forbes magazine about deception. Much of his research has utilized analyses of linguistic and analytic styles of writing, for example, Markowitz's work on pet adoption ads was referenced in a website featuring tips on how to write better pet adoption ads.

Markowitz was featured in the NPR podcast "The Indicator from Planet Money" that focused a discussion around his research concerning deception on dating apps. His research is published in premiere communication journals such as the Journal for Communication. Markowitz conducted a study that found some people feel more comfortable simply having their phones in their proximity. Automated text analyses were used by Markowitz to examine how peoples' communication patterns related to their dehumanization of immigrants. His work on deception has intersected with the proliferation of lies told by politicians and prolific liars.

== COLD Model ==
Markowitz and Jeffrey Hancock developed the Contextual Organization of Language and Deception model (COLD) to better explain how context and genre influence language. More specifically, their work highlights how previous research has not incorporated these constructs as influences on how communication changes during deceptive maneuvers.

== Faucet metaphor of deception ==
Markowitz developed the deception faucet, a metaphor to illustrate how truth-telling and lying do not work as polar opposites of one another, in other words, they are not dichotomous experiences. Instead, much like the water flowing from a faucet, there is a mix of cold and hot water mixing into the output or stream. With language, communicators create messages that vary in veracity and though they may not create a lie that is "steaming hot" and visually and obvious, it may become obvious through closer experience with the information. This model is based on the work of Levine and his truth-default theory, and further from the work of Paul Grice on language implicature. The deceptive discourse that is produced during deception that violates conversational norms, also known as the cooperative principle (or Grice's Maxims) is explained by information manipulation theory (IMT) and IMT2.
