= Jeffrey T. Hancock =

American social media researcher

Jeffrey T. Hancock is a communication and psychology researcher and professor at Stanford University's Department of Communication, widely recognized for his work on deception, trust in technology, and the psychology of social media. He has authored more than 80 journal articles and has been cited by media outlets including NPR and CBS This Morning.

In 2024, Hancock became embroiled in controversy after he was retained by the Minnesota Attorney General as an expert witness to defend a state law prohibiting the use of AI-generated deepfakes in elections. Hancock submitted a court filing that relied on ChatGPT, which contains citations of fake, non-existent sources. A federal judge barred his testimony, citing the "irony" and the resulting collapse of his credibility.

== Education and personal life ==
Hancock was born in Canada, though he currently resides in Palo Alto, California. He received his bachelor's degree of Applied Science in Psychology from the University of Victoria in 1996. During his undergraduate college career, Hancock was a Customs Officer for Canada Border Service Agency, which introduced him to deception. In 1997, he began his doctoral program in Psychology at Dalhousie University in Canada, from which he would graduate in 2002. From 2002 to 2015, Hancock was a faculty member and professor of Information Science and Communication at Cornell University.

== Academia ==
Since 2015, Hancock has been a professor in the Department of Communication at Stanford University. In his tenure at Stanford University, he founded the Stanford Social Media Lab. This lab, whose publications date back to March 2017, works to understand psychological and interpersonal processes in social media. The lab’s network includes faculty, staff, and doctoral candidates who study social media in various capacities. Some research focuses of the lab include romantic relationships through the use of technology, how new media affects child and adolescent development, gender biases and other social inequalities on social networks, and more. The Stanford Social Media Lab receives funding from the Stanford Institute for Human-Centered Artificial Intelligence, the Knight Foundation, and the National Science Foundation. Some notable lab alumni include Annabell Suh, Megan French, and David M. Markowitz.

In addition to his research focuses and lab work, Hancock teaches courses during the academic year. During the 2020–21 academic year at Stanford University, some of his course offerings included: Advanced Studies in Behavior and Social Media; Introduction to Communication; Language and Technology; Truth, Trust, and Tech; and six sections of independent study.

He has also taught courses for Curiosity University (formerly One Day University), and in 2012 delivered a TED Talk in Winnipeg.

== Research ==
Hancock is a communication and psychology researcher who has published over 80 journal articles in his career. His research interests involve studying how language can reveal social and psychological dynamics, including deception and trust, emotional dynamics, intimacy and relationships, social support, and the ethical concerns associated with computation computer science. His work has been published in several notable journals, like the Journal of Communication, and has been funded by the National Science Foundation and the United States Department of Defense.

In a study published in 2009 in the Journal of Communication, Hancock and his co-author investigated the accuracy of online dating service photographs. The study, whose participant pool included 54 heterosexual dater profiles, found that daters juggle the line between presenting themselves in photos to enhance their physical attractiveness and presenting a photo that would not be considered deceptive. This is just one example of the connection between Hancock’s different research interests, deception and interpersonal relationships mediated through technology. Many of Hancock’s articles involve more than one of his areas of research expertise.

Outside of the scope of communication researchers and academics, Hancock’s work has been able to reach a lay audience through his inclusion in several non-academic presentations of his research. His 2012 presentation at TED, entitled "The Future of Lying," has been viewed over one million times. In this TED Talk, Hancock details the way that most online, technology-mediated communication is more honest than face-to-face communication. He posits that this can be explained by the permanence of online communication. Before the invention of writing and social media, words were only as permanent as the memory of the people who heard them. Now, technology memorializes everyday interactions and compels us to consider what record we are leaving behind in our online communication. In the 2014 "Why we Lie" episode of NPR’s TED Radio Hour, Hancock also discussed the implications of his research that suggest that technology can actually make us more honest. The podcast episode referenced Hancock’s 2012 TED Talk but expanded the narrative and provided more context to the research backing his claims.

In 2012, Hancock appeared in a segment on CBS This Morning to talk about social media privacy in the job hunt and modern challenges of the digital age after some places of work were reportedly asking job applicants to submit their social media login information for an audit of their account. This talk show appearance came just a few weeks after Hancock published an article titled, “The Effect of LinkedIn on Deception in Resumes.” That journal article found that LinkedIn profiles and resumes were less deceptive than paper resumes concerning job experience and skills. In an article published in Social Media + Society in 2020, Hancock and his co-author wrote about the challenges the COVID-19 pandemic has placed on older adults. As social distancing is implemented to slow the spread of COVID-19, older adults are left facing challenges involving loneliness and a lack of proficiency in digital skills. The article recommends that technology companies make accessibility by older adults a priority in product development to help prevent loneliness and increase media literacy.

== AI-generated court filing ==
In November 2024, Hancock used AI to generate a court filing with two non-existent sources to defend a Minnesota law banning the usage of AI-generated deepfakes to influence an election. Hancock submitted the filing to the court under penalty of perjury. The AI generated content was noticed by attorneys for Minnesota state representative Mary Franson and YouTuber Christopher Kohls, who sued to block the law on free speech grounds. Hancock's filing was excluded from consideration after his AI generated "hallucinations" were discovered. Hancock admitted to using ChatGPT-4o for his filing.

Hancock was paid $600 an hour by Minnesota Attorney General Keith Ellison to provide his expert testimony in defense of Minnesota's law. A request by the attorney general's office to allow Hancock to submit a revised filing without the AI generated hallucinations was rejected, with the presiding judge stating that Hancock's usage of fake sources "shatters his credibility with this Court".
