= Gender role =

Social role associated with gender or sex

A gender role, or sex role, is a social norm deemed appropriate or desirable for individuals based on their gender or sex, and is usually centered on societal views of masculinity and femininity.

The specifics of these gendered expectations may vary across cultures, while other characteristics may be common across many cultures. In addition, gender roles (and perceived gender roles) vary based on a person's race or ethnicity.

Gender roles influence a wide range of human behavior, often including the clothing a person chooses to wear, the profession a person pursues, the manner in which a person approaches things, the personal relationships a person enters, and how they behave within those relationships. Although gender roles have evolved and expanded, they have traditionally kept women in the "private" sphere and men in the "public" sphere.

Various groups, most notably feminist movements, have led efforts to change aspects of prevailing gender roles that they believe are oppressive, inaccurate, and sexist.while other more conservative groups deem them necessary and nature

A study of 24 regions found that people who’ve attained a higher level education were more likely to support equal gender roles (Boehnke, 2011).

== Background ==
A gender role, also known as a sex role, is a social role encompassing a range of behaviors and attitudes that are generally considered acceptable, appropriate, or desirable for a person based on that person's sex. Gender roles can be linked with essentialism, the idea that humans have a set of attributes that are necessary to their identity based on their gender. Sociologists tend to use the term "gender role" instead of "sex role", because the sociocultural understanding of gender is distinguished from biological conceptions of sex. There are multiple theories that explain how gender roles can affect different aspects of everyday life.

In the sociology of gender, the process whereby an individual learns and acquires a gender role in society is termed gender socialization.

Gender roles are culturally specific, and while most cultures distinguish only two (boy/man and girl/woman), others recognize more than two. Some non-Western societies have three genders: men, women, and a third gender. Buginese society has identified five genders. Androgyny has sometimes also been proposed as a third gender. An androgyne or androgynous person is someone with qualities of both the male and female gender. Some individuals identify with no gender at all.

Many transgender people identify simply as men or women, and do not constitute a separate third gender. Biological differences between (some) trans women and cisgender women have historically been treated as relevant in certain contexts, especially those where biological traits may yield an unfair advantage, such as sport.

Gender role is not the same thing as gender identity, which refers to the internal sense of one's own gender, whether or not it aligns with categories offered by societal norms. The point at which these internalized gender identities become externalized into a set of expectations is the genesis of a gender role.

== Theories ==
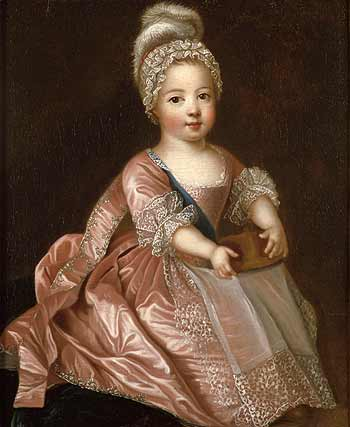
Changing norms of gender socialization: Louis XV in 1712, wearing the customary clothes of unbreeched boys, would be considered cross-dressed in the 21st century.

Sex differences in psychology can be explained by various theories, see possible causes. According to the theory of social constructionism, gendered behavior is mostly due to the social construction of gender. Other theories such as evolutionary psychology disagree with that position.

Most children learn to categorize themselves by gender by the age of three. From birth, in the course of gender socialization, children learn gender stereotypes and roles from their parents and environment. Traditionally, boys learn to manipulate their physical and social environment through physical strength or dexterity, while girls learn to present themselves as objects to be viewed. Social constructionists argue that differences between male and female behavior are better attributable to gender-segregated children's activities than to any essential, natural, physiological, or genetic predisposition.

A 2024 study researched the social construction of gender. The author, V.J. Daniels, discussed the relationship between the gender pay gap and social construction. She looked at the gendered language in different statutes and cognitive dissonance. The author examined whether there was gendered language in literature and in laws governing equal pay. The second part of her research question was to see if the gendered language in these laws, acts, and literature affected how individuals' experiences. The author found that in the Equal Pay Act of 1963, gendered language was strongly feminine, whereas in the Civil Rights Act of 1964 and the Paycheck Fairness Act (2021–22), it was strongly masculine. In total, there were more masculine words than feminine. The results of the interview portion of the study indicated that the male interviewee had a high Bem score, meaning he expected his needs to be heard in his home life and at work. The women who were interviewed had a low score, meaning they did not expect their needs to be listened to in their home life and workplace.

As an aspect of role theory, gender role theory "treats these differing distributions of women and men into roles as the primary origin of sex-differentiated social behavior, [and posits that] their impact on behavior is mediated by psychological and social processes." According to Gilbert Herdt, gender roles arose from correspondent inference, meaning that general labor division was extended to gender roles.

Social constructionists consider gender roles to be hierarchical and patriarchal. The term patriarchy, according to researcher Andrew Cherlin, defines "a social order based on the domination of women by men, especially in agricultural societies".

According to Eagly et al., the consequences of gender roles and stereotypes are sex-typed social behavior because roles and stereotypes are both socially shared descriptive and prescriptive norms.

Conflicts between aspects of gender roles result in gender role conflicts.

== Major theorists ==
=== Talcott Parsons ===
Working in the United States in 1955, Talcott Parsons developed a model of the nuclear family, which, at that time and place, was the prevalent family structure. The model compared a traditional contemporaneous view of gender roles with a more liberal view. The Parsons model was used to contrast and illustrate extreme positions on gender roles, i.e., gender roles described in the sense of Max Weber's ideal types (an exaggerated and simplified version of a phenomenon, used for analytical purposes) rather than how they appear in reality. Model A described a total separation of male and female roles, while Model B described the complete dissolution of gender roles.

	Model A – Total role segregation	Model B – Total integration of roles
Education	Gender-specific education: a high professional qualification is important only for men.	Co-educative schools, same content of classes for girls and boys, same qualification for men and women.
Profession	The workplace is not the primary domain for women; career and professional advancement are deemed unimportant to them.	For women, a career is just as important as for men; equal professional opportunities for men and women are necessary.
Housework	Housekeeping and child care are the primary functions of the woman; participation of the man in these functions is only partially wanted.	Both parties to the marriage do all housework in equal shares.
Decision making	In case of conflict, man has the last say, for example, in choosing the place to live, the choice of school for children, and buying decisions.	Neither partner dominates; solutions do not always follow the principle of finding a concerted decision; status quo is maintained if disagreement occurs.
Child care and education	Woman takes care of the largest part of these functions; she educates children and cares for them in every way.	Man and a woman share these functions equally.

The model is consciously a simplification; individuals' actual behavior usually lies somewhere between these poles. According to the interactionist approach, gender roles are not fixed but are constantly renegotiated between individuals.

=== John Money ===
"In the 1950s, John Money and his colleagues took up the study of intersex individuals, who, Money realized, 'would provide invaluable material for the comparative study of bodily form and physiology, rearing, and psychosexual orientation'." Money coined the term gender role, which he defined in a seminal 1955 paper as "all those things that a person says or does to disclose himself or herself as having the status of boy or man, girl or woman."

The team concluded that gonads, hormones, and chromosomes did not automatically determine a child's gender role. In other words, children do not have a gender role, which is often assigned by society. Money's 1955 definition of 'gender role' was closer to gender identity or expression.

=== West and Zimmerman ===
Candace West and Don H. Zimmerman developed an interactionist perspective on gender that goes beyond the construction of "roles." For them, gender is "the product of social doings of some sort undertaken by men and women whose competence as members of society is hostage to its production." Elisabeth K. Kelan describes this approach as an "ethnomethodological approach" which analyzes "micro interactions to reveal how the objective and given nature of the world is accomplished," suggesting that gender does not exist until it is empirically perceived and performed through interactions. West and Zimmerman argued that the use of "role" to describe gender expectations conceals the production of gender through everyday activities. Furthermore, they stated that roles are situated identities, such as "nurse" and "student," which are developed as the situation demands, while gender is a master identity with no specific site or organizational context. For them, "conceptualizing gender as a role makes it difficult to assess its influence on other roles and reduces its explanatory usefulness in discussions of power and inequality." West and Zimmerman consider gender an individual production that reflects and constructs interactional and institutional gender expectations.

=== Judith Butler ===
Judith Butler wrote Gender Trouble and Undoing Gender. She claims that people feel pressure to adhere to gender norms and the actions gender roles dictate. Because gender roles are so ingrained in our society, it is difficult to overcome them. Gender becomes concrete through our actions that reinforce gender. Butler calls this "reiteration": doing certain activities that reinforce our gender. Then, through the process of "materialization", these gender roles and norms shape the way we move throughout the world. Butler poses that gender is something we "do" through gender roles. Therefore, gender can be "undone," and gender is not a natural occurrence. Societies uphold gender through "functional sex roles", or gender roles. However, the structures that uphold gender can change over time.

Departures from the norm show that gender roles are not enforced by anything other than their repeated use and enforcement. Therefore, gender roles are not real, but are constructed by humans in society. When realizing that gender and sex as the basis for these roles are not stable, it is easy to see how the roles themselves are not stable either. Gender and sex are more diverse than the gender binary and the sex binary, so gender roles could also be diverse.

== Biological factors ==
Historically, gender roles have been largely attributed to biological differences between men and women. Although research indicates that biology plays a role in gendered behavior, the extent of its effects on gender roles is less clear.

One hypothesis attributes differences in gender roles to evolution. The sociobiological view argues that men's fitness is increased by being aggressive, allowing them to compete with other men for access to females, as well as by being sexually promiscuous and trying to father as many children as possible. Women benefit from bonding with infants and caring for children. Sociobiologists argue that these roles are evolutionary and led to the establishment of traditional gender roles, with women in the domestic sphere and men dominant in every other area. However, this view pre-assumes a view of nature that is contradicted by the fact that women engage in hunting in 79% of modern hunter-gatherer societies. However, an attempted verification of this study found "that multiple methodological failures all bias their results in the same direction...their analysis does not contradict the wide body of empirical evidence for gendered divisions of labor in foraging societies".

Another hypothesis attributes differences in gender roles to prenatal exposure to hormones. Early research examining the effect of biology on gender roles by John Money and Anke Ehrhardt primarily focused on girls with congenital adrenal hyperplasia (CAH), resulting in higher-than-normal prenatal exposure to androgens. Their research found that girls with CAH exhibited tomboy-like behavior, were less interested in dolls, and were less likely to make-believe as parents. Many methodological problems with the studies have been identified. A study on 1950s American teenage girls who had been exposed to androgenic steroids by their mothers in utero exhibited more traditionally masculine behavior, such as being more concerned about their future career than marriage, wearing pants, and not being interested in jewelry.

Sociologist Linda L. Lindsey critiqued the notion that gender roles are a result of prenatal hormone exposure, saying that while hormones may explain sex differences like sexual orientation and gender identity, they "cannot account for gender differences in other roles such as nurturing, love, and criminal behavior". By contrast, some research indicates that both neurobiological and social risk factors can interact in a way that predisposes one to engaging in criminal behavior (including juvenile delinquency).

A 2017 study examined sex and gender differences in empathy and moral cognition. The research question of this study was whether sex differences and gender roles affect empathy. Two studies were conducted in this paper. The first study had 10,802 participants, who completed a survey to assess their empathy for pain and were presented with two moral dilemmas. The second study was a subsample of the first study containing 334 participants. The participants in study two did the same as in study one, but they also had to complete a questionnaire on empathy. The findings of the first study showed a significant difference in empathy levels between reported genders. Women showed higher empathy levels on more tests than men did. In the second study, the results were similar: women had higher empathy scores on the questionnaire than men. There were some limitations in this study. Since their second study was a subset of the first study's population, the results were similar. If a different group of participants had been used, the results may have varied.

Concerning gender stereotypes, the societal roles and differences in power between men and women are much more strongly indicated than is a biological component.

== In culture ==
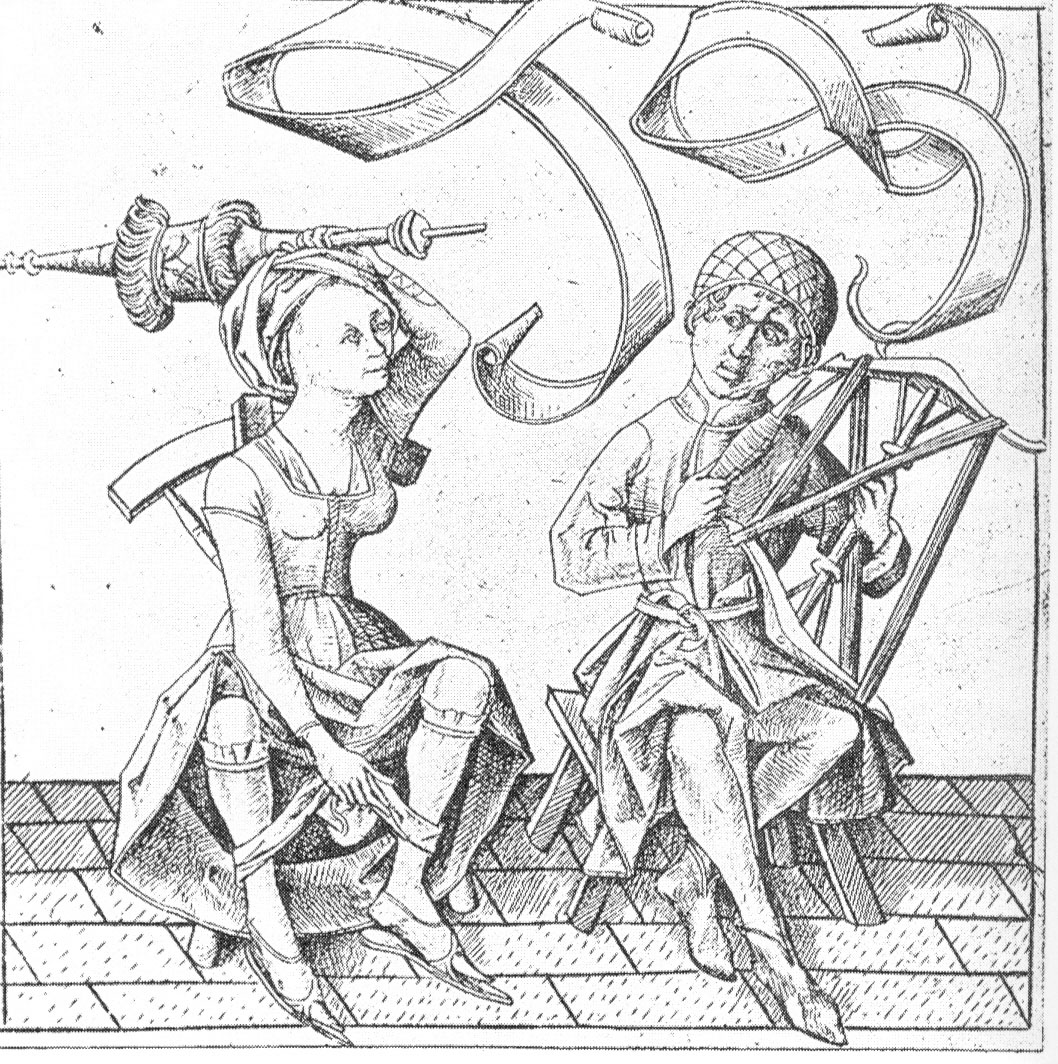
The world turned upside down, by Israhel van Meckenem the Younger. The wife is holding the sceptre, and the man is spinning.

Ideas of appropriate gendered behavior vary among cultures and eras, although some aspects receive more widespread attention than others. In the World Values Survey, respondents were asked whether wage work should be restricted to men only in the case of a shortage of jobs: in Iceland, the proportion who agreed was 3.6%, while in Egypt it was 94.9%.

Attitudes have also varied historically. For example, in Europe during the Middle Ages, women were commonly associated with roles in medicine and healing. Because of the rise of witch-hunts across Europe and the institutionalization of medicine, these roles became exclusively associated with men. In the last few decades, these roles have become largely gender-neutral in Western society.

Vern Bullough stated that LGBTQ+ communities are generally more tolerant of switching gender roles. For instance, someone with a masculine voice, a five o'clock shadow (or a fuller beard), an Adam's apple, wearing a woman's dress and high heels, carrying a purse would most likely draw ridicule or other unfriendly attention in ordinary social contexts.

Because the dominant class sees this form of gender expression as unacceptable, inappropriate, or perhaps threatening, these individuals are significantly more likely to experience discrimination and harassment both in their personal lives and from their employers, according to a 2011 report from the Center for American Progress.

Gender roles may be a means through which one expresses one's gender identity, but they may also be employed as a means of exerting social control, and individuals may experience negative social consequences for violating them.

=== Gender stereotypes ===
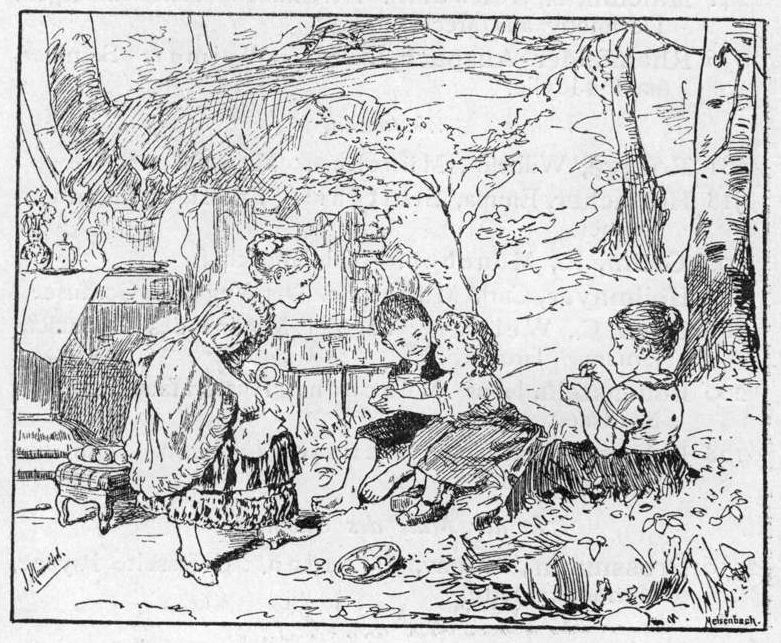
An 1883 German illustration of children playing house

A 1992 study tested gender stereotypes and labeling within young children in the United States. Fagot et al. divided this into two different studies; the first investigated how children identified the differences between gender labels of boys and girls, the second study looked at both gender labeling and stereotyping in the relationship of mother and child.

In the first study, 23 children between the ages of 2 and 7 underwent a series of gender-labeling and gender-stereotyping tests: the children viewed either pictures of males and females or objects such as a hammer or a broom, then identified or labeled them according to a certain gender. The results of these tests showed that children under three years could make gender-stereotypic associations.

The second study examined gender labeling and stereotyping in the mother-child relationship using three separate methods. The first consisted of identifying gender labeling and stereotyping, essentially the same method as the first study. The second consisted of behavioral observations that examined 10-minute play sessions between mother and child using gender-specific toys.

The third study used a series of questionnaires, such as the "Attitude Toward Women Scale," the "Personal Attributes Questionnaire" and the "Schaefer and Edgerton Scale," which examined the mother's family values.

The results of these studies were the same as those of the first study with regard to labeling and stereotyping.

They also identified in the second method that the mothers' positive reactions and responses to same-sex or opposite-sex toys played a role in how children identified them. In the third method, the results showed that the mothers of children who passed the "Gender Labeling Test" held more traditional family values. These two studies, conducted by Beverly I. Fagot, Mar D. Leinbach, and Cherie O'Boyle, showed that gender stereotyping and labeling are acquired at a very young age and that social interactions and associations play a large role in how genders are identified.

Virginia Woolf, in the 1920s, made the point: "It is obvious that the values of women differ very often from the values which have been made by the other sex. Yet it is the masculine values that prevail", remade sixty years later by psychologist Carol Gilligan who used it to show that psychological tests of maturity have generally been based on masculine parameters, and so tended to show that women were less 'mature'. Gilligan countered this in her groundbreaking work, In a Different Voice, holding that maturity in women is shown in terms of different but equally important human values.

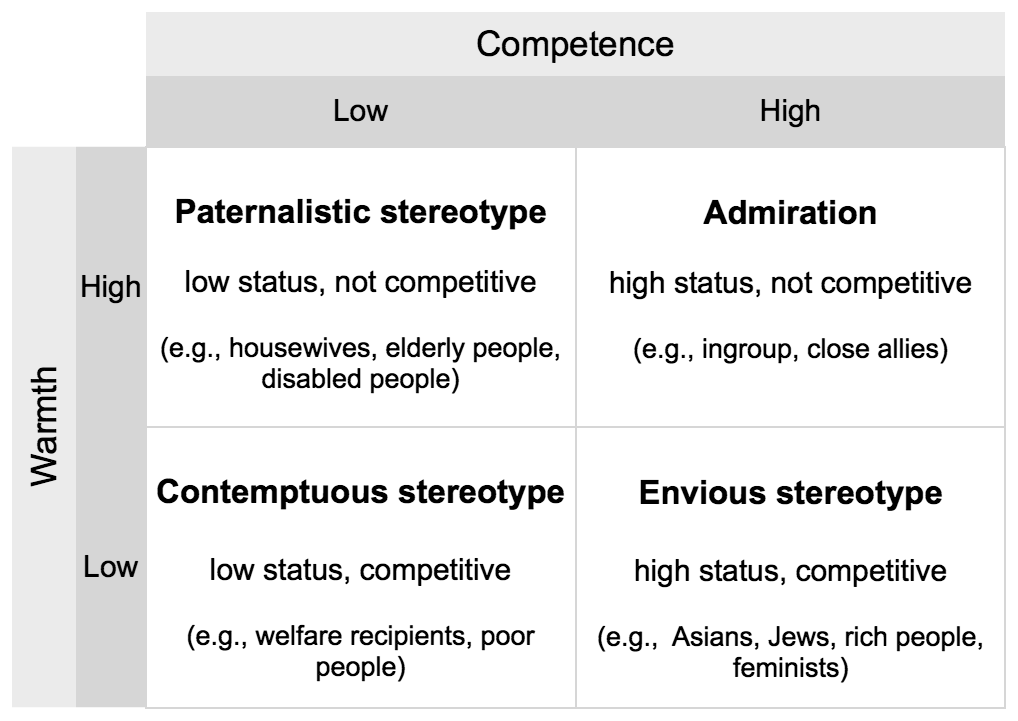
Stereotype content model, adapted from Fiske et al. (2002): Four types of stereotypes resulting from combinations of perceived warmth and competence.

Gender stereotypes are extremely common in society. One of the reasons this may be is simply because it is easier on the brain to stereotype (see Heuristics).

The brain has limited perceptual and memory systems, so it categorizes information into fewer, simpler units, allowing for more efficient information processing. Gender stereotypes appear to have an effect at an early age. In one study, the effects of gender stereotypes on children's mathematical abilities were tested. In this study of American children between the ages of six and ten, it was found that the children, as early as the second grade, demonstrated the gender stereotype that mathematics is a 'boy's subject'. This may show that mathematical self-belief is influenced before the age at which discernible differences in mathematical achievement emerge.

According to the 1972 study by Jean Lipman-Blumen, women who grew up with traditional gender roles were less likely to want higher education, while women brought up with the view that men and women are equal were more likely to want higher education. This result indicates that gender roles that have been passed down traditionally can influence stereotypes about gender.

In a later study, Deaux and her colleagues (1984) found that most people think women are more nurturant but less self-assertive than men, and that this belief is universal, though this awareness is related to women's role. To put it another way, women do not have an inherently nurturing personality; rather, a nurturing personality is acquired by whoever happens to do the housework.

A study of gender stereotypes by Jacobs (1991) found that parents' stereotypes interact with the sex of their child to directly influence the parents' beliefs about the child's abilities. In turn, parents' beliefs about their child directly influence their child's self-perceptions, and both the parents' stereotypes and the child's self-perceptions influence the child's performance.

Stereotype threat involves the risk of confirming, as a self-characteristic, a negative stereotype about one's group. In the case of gender it is the implicit belief in gender stereotype that women perform worse than men in mathematics, which is proposed to lead to lower performance by women.

A review article of stereotype threat research (2012) relating to the relationship between gender and mathematical abilities concluded "that although stereotype threat may affect some women, the existing state of knowledge does not support the current level of enthusiasm for this [as a] mechanism underlying the gender gap in mathematics".

In 2018, Jolien A. van Breen and colleagues conducted research into subliminal gender stereotyping. Researchers took participants through a fictional "Moral Choice Dilemma Task", which presented eight scenarios "in which sacrificing one person can save several others of unspecified gender. In four scenarios, participants are asked to sacrifice a man to save several others (of unspecified gender), and in four other scenarios they are asked to sacrifice a woman." The results showed that women who identified as feminists were more willing to 'sacrifice' men than women who did not identify as feminists. "If a person wanted to counteract that and 'level the playing field', that can be done either by boosting women or by downgrading men", said van Breen. "So I think that this effect on evaluations of men arises because our participants are trying to achieve an underlying aim: counteracting gender stereotypes."

According to Professor Lei Chang, gender attitudes within the domains of work and domestic roles can be measured using a cross-cultural gender role attitudes test. Psychological processes in the East have historically been analysed using Western models (or instruments) that have been translated, a process that may be more far-reaching than linguistic translation. Some North American instruments for assessing gender role attitudes include:

- Attitudes Towards Women Scale,
- Sex-Role Egalitarian Scale, and
- Sex-Role Ideology Scale.

Through such tests, it is known that American southerners exhibit less egalitarian gender views than their northern counterparts, demonstrating that gender views are inevitably affected by an individual's culture. This also may differ among compatriots whose 'cultures' are a few hundred miles apart.

A study by Richard Bagozzi, Nancy Wong, and Youjae Yi examines the interaction between culture and gender that produces distinct patterns of association between positive and negative emotions. The United States was considered a more 'independence-based culture', while China was considered 'interdependence-based'. In the US, people tend to experience emotions in oppositional terms, whereas in China, they do so in dialectical terms (i.e., those of logical argumentation and contradictory forces). The study continued with sets of psychological tests administered to university students in Beijing and Michigan. The fundamental goals of the research were to show that "gender differences in emotions are adaptive for the differing roles that males and females play in the culture". The evidence for differences in gender role was found during the socialization in work experiment, proving that "women are socialized to be more expressive of their feelings and to show this to a greater extent in facial expressions and gestures, as well as by verbal means". The study extended to the biological characteristics of both gender groups — for a higher association between PA and NA hormones in memory for women, the cultural patterns became more evident for women than for men.

=== Implicit gender stereotypes ===
Gender stereotypes and roles can also be supported implicitly. Implicit stereotypes are the unconscious influence of attitudes that a person may or may not even be aware that they hold. Gender stereotypes can also be held in this manner. Research has shown that these roles are reinforced through socialization and institutional practices.

These implicit stereotypes can often be demonstrated by the Implicit-association test (IAT).

One example of an implicit gender stereotype is the belief that males are better at mathematics than females. It has been found that men have stronger positive associations with mathematics than women, while women have stronger negative associations with mathematics, and the more strongly a woman associates herself with the female gender identity, the more negative her association with mathematics.

These associations have been disputed for their biological connection to gender and have been attributed to social forces that perpetuate stereotypes such as aforementioned stereotype that men are better at mathematics than women.

This particular stereotype has been found in American children as early as second grade.

The same test found that the strength of a Singaporean child's mathematics-gender stereotype and gender identity predicted the child's association between individuals and mathematical ability.

It has been shown that this stereotype also reflects mathematical performance: a study was done on a worldwide scale, and it was found that the strength of this mathematics-gender stereotype in varying countries correlates with 8th graders' scores on the TIMSS, a standardized math and science achievement test that is given worldwide. The results were adjusted for general gender inequality and remained significant.

=== Changing roles ===
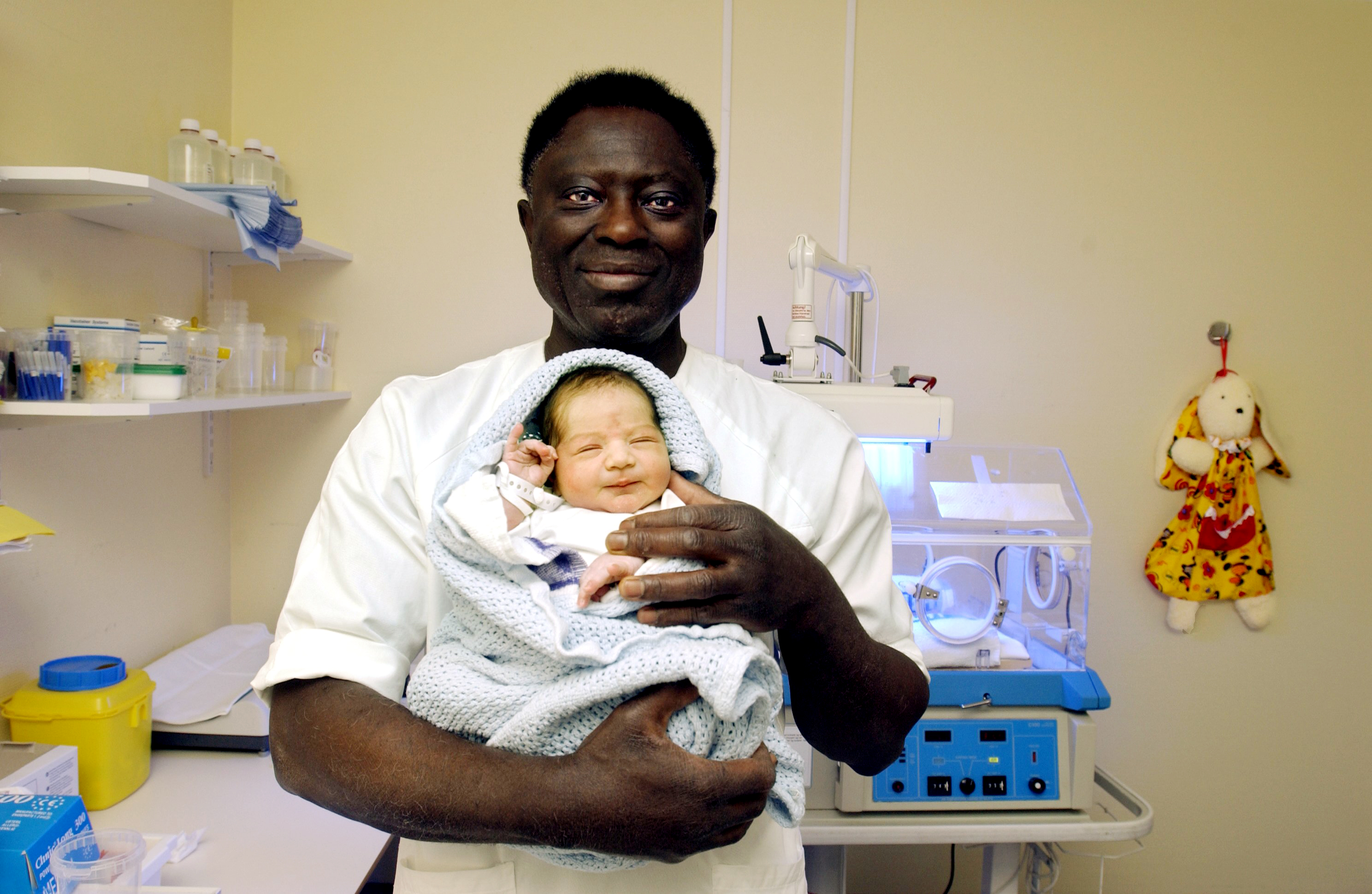
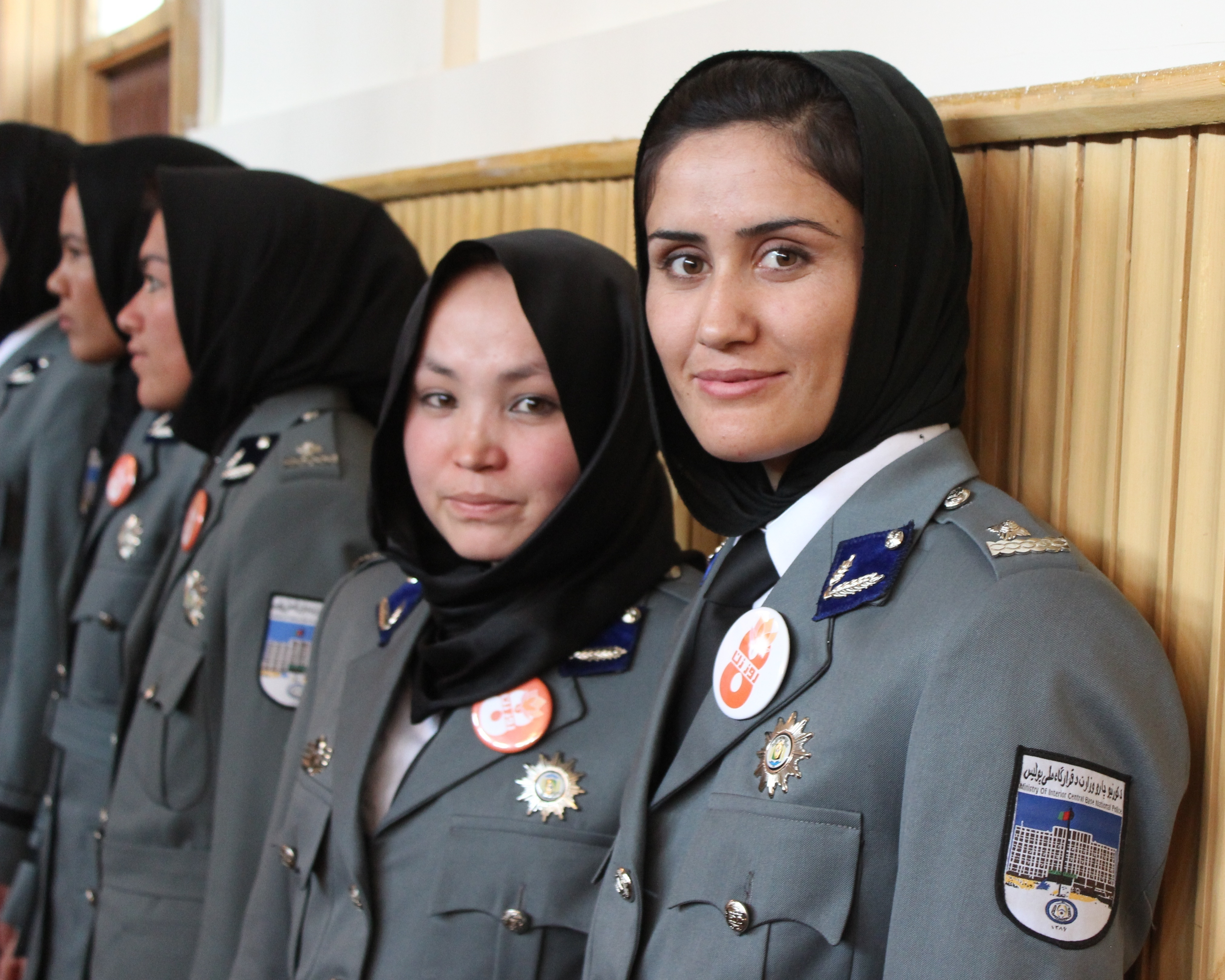
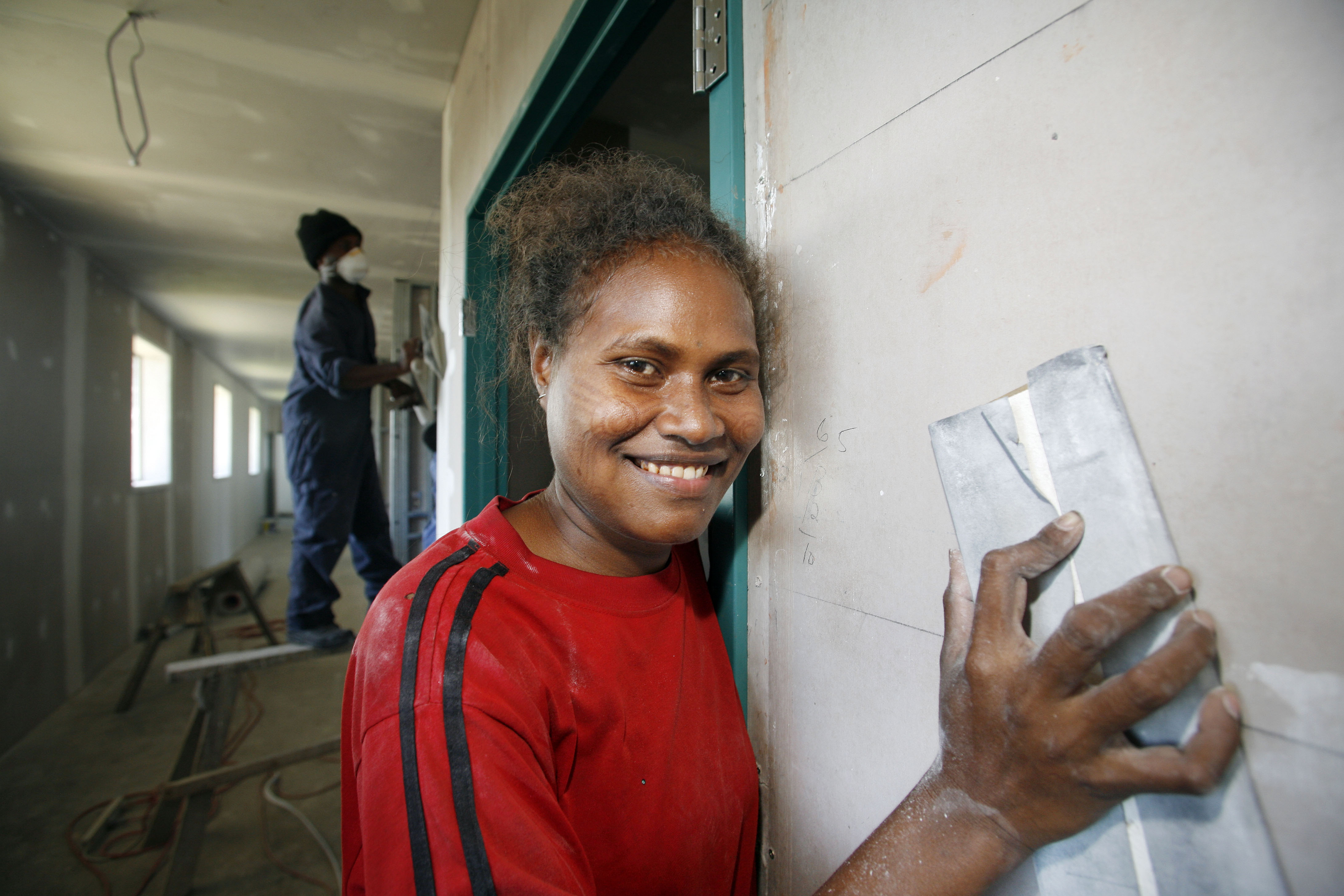
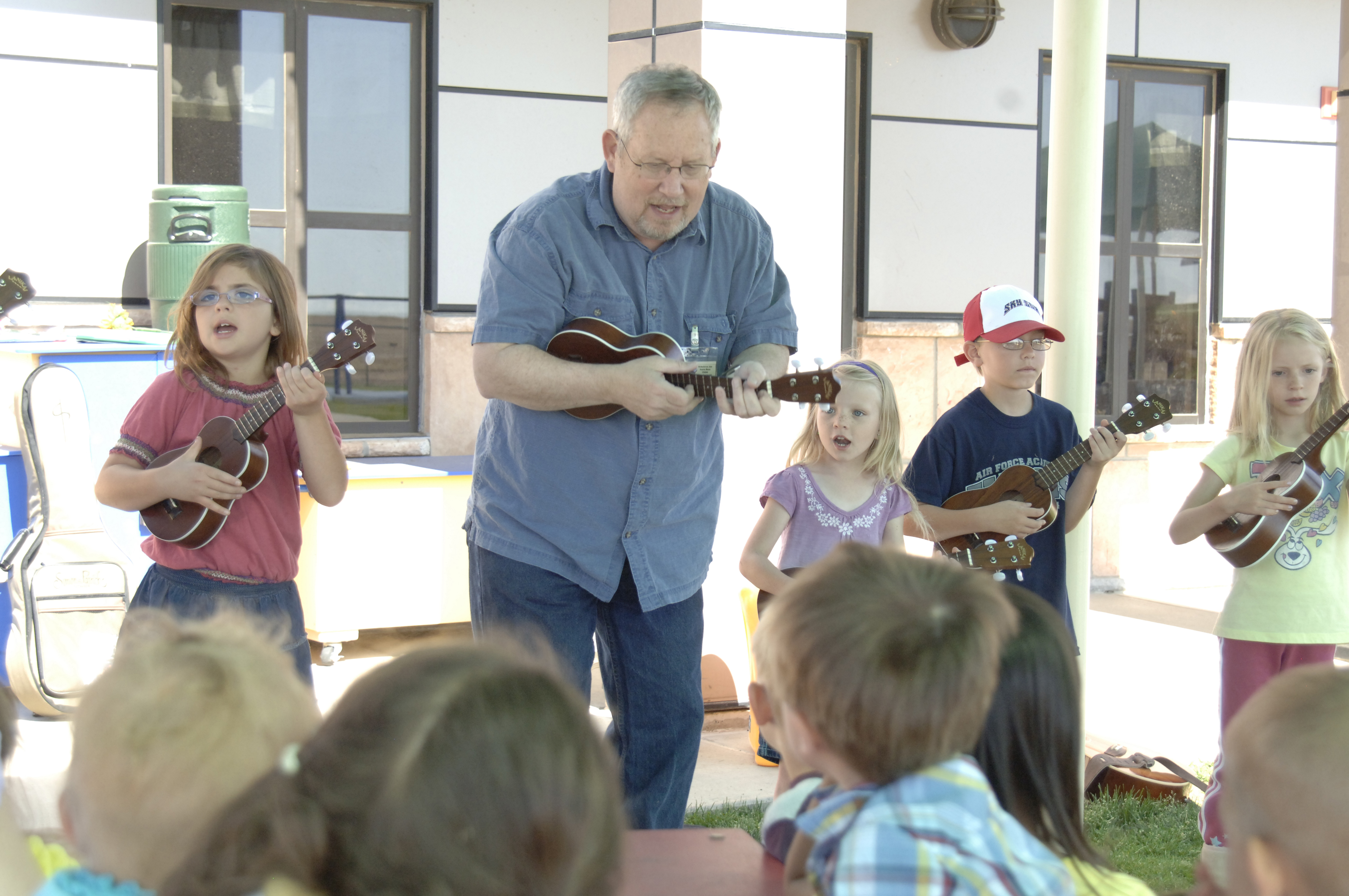
Men and women in non-traditional gendered occupations clockwise from top left: a male midwife in Oslo, Norway; women being sworn into the Afghan National Police; a male kindergarten teacher in Colorado Springs, U.S. playing the ukulele; a woman doing construction work in the Solomon Islands

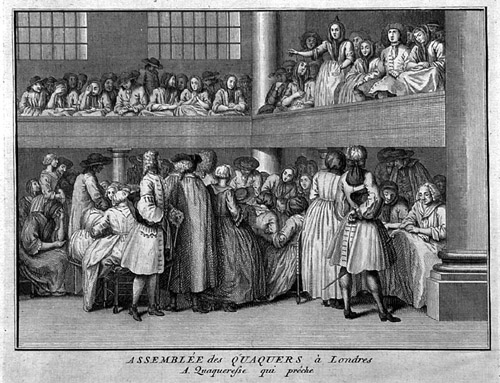
A woman publicly witnessing at a Quaker meeting seemed an extraordinary feature of the Religious Society of Friends, worth recording for a wider public. Engraving by Bernard Picart, ca 1723.

Throughout history, spouses have been charged with certain societal functions. With the rise of the New World came the expected roles that each spouse was to carry out specifically. Husbands were typically working farmers - the providers. Wives were caregivers for children and the home. However, the roles are now changing, and even reversing.

Societies can change in ways that rapidly alter gender roles. The 21st century has seen a shift in gender roles due to multiple factors, including new family structures, education, and media. A 2003 survey by the US Bureau of Labor Statistics found that about 1/3 of wives earned more than their husbands.

With the importance of education emphasized nationwide and access to college degrees (online, for example), women have begun furthering their education. Women have also started to get more involved in recreation activities such as sports, which in the past were regarded to be for men. Family dynamic structures are changing, and the number of single-mother or single-father households is increasing. Fathers are also becoming more involved in raising their children, rather than the responsibility resting solely with the mother.

Ralph H. Turner claims that as more women work, we expect gender roles to be more evenly distributed between husband and wife. While that is true to some extent, as men may take on more roles within the house and women contribute more financially, there are few large-scale changes. Gender roles are so ingrained in our society that it is difficult to break out of them and change our overall societal norms. As long as gender roles exist, they will continue to be enforced. Thus, changing our practices can change gender norms. As we continue to see certain gender roles as archaic, we will stop regulating gender norms and will displace gender roles.

According to the Pew Research Center, the number of stay-at-home fathers in the US nearly doubled in the period from 1989 to 2012, from 1.1 million to 2.0 million. This trend appears to be mirrored in a number of countries including the UK, Canada and Sweden. However, Pew also found that, at least in the US, public opinion in general appears to show a substantial bias toward favoring a mother as a care-taker versus a father, regardless of any shift in actual roles each plays.

Gender equality allows gender roles to become less distinct, and according to Donnalyn Pompper, is the reason "men no longer own breadwinning identities and, like women, their bodies are objectified in mass media images." The LGBTQ rights movement has played a role increasing pro-gay attitudes, which according to Brian McNair, are expressed by many metrosexual men.

Besides North America and Europe, other regions are also seeing changes in gender roles. In Asia, Hong Kong is very close to the USA because female surgeons in these societies are focused heavily on home life, whereas in Japan, they are focused more on work life. After a female surgeon gives birth in Hong Kong, she wants to reduce her work schedule but continues working full-time (60–80 hours per week). Similar to Hong Kong, Japanese surgeons still work long hours, but they try to rearrange their schedules so they can be at home more (end up working less than 60 hours). Although all three places have women working advanced jobs, the female surgeons in the US and Hong Kong feel more gender equality at home, where they have equal, if not more control of their families, and Japanese surgeons feel the men are still in control.

A big change was seen in Hong Kong because wives used to deal with unhappy marriages. Now, Chinese wives have been divorcing their husbands when they feel unhappy with their marriages, and are stable financially. This makes the wife seem more in control of her own life rather than letting her husband control her. Other places, such as Singapore and Taipei, are also seeing changes in gender roles. In many societies, but especially in Singapore and Taipei, women hold more leadership positions (e.g., doctors or managers) and fewer regular worker positions (e.g., clerks or salespeople). The males in Singapore also have more leadership roles, but they have more lower level jobs too. In the past, women would get the lower-level jobs, and men would get all the leadership positions. There is an increase in male unemployment in Singapore, Taipei, and Hong Kong, so women are having to work more to support their families. In the past, the males were usually the ones supporting the family.

In India, women are married young and are expected to run the household, even if they did not finish school. It is seen as shameful if a woman has to work outside of the house to help support the family. Many women are starting jewelry businesses inside their houses and have their own bank accounts because of it. Middle-aged women can now work without shame because they are no longer childbearing.

== In sexual relationships ==
=== Communication of sexual desire ===
Metts, et al. explain that sexual desire is linked to emotions and communicative expression. Communication is central in expressing sexual desire and "complicated emotional states", and is also the "mechanism for negotiating the relationship implications of sexual activity and emotional meanings". Gender differences appear to exist in communicating sexual desire; for example, masculine people are generally perceived to be more interested in sex than feminine people, and research suggests that masculine people are more likely than feminine people to express sexual interest.

This may be greatly affected by masculine people being less inhibited by social norms for expressing their desire, being more aware of their sexual desire, or succumbing to the expectations of their cultures. When feminine people employ tactics to show their sexual desire, they are typically more indirect in nature. On the other hand, it is known that masculinity is associated with aggressive behavior in almost all mammals. It most likely explains at least part of the fact that masculine people are more likely to express their sexual interest. This is known as the Challenge hypothesis.

Various studies show different communication strategies with a feminine person refusing a masculine person's sexual interest. Some research, like that of Murnen, show that when feminine people offer refusals, the refusals are verbal and typically direct. When masculine people do not comply with this refusal, feminine people offer stronger and more direct refusals. However, research from Perper and Weis showed that rejection includes acts of avoidance, creating distractions, making excuses, departure, hinting, arguments to delay, etc. These differences in refusal communication techniques are just one example of the importance of communicative competence for both masculine and feminine gender cultures.

=== Dating and Courtship ===
Dating and courtship can be social environments where gendered roles shape the expectations of initiating contact, who pays for what, how emotions are expressed, and progressing toward a relationship. Traditionally within many heterosexual dating scenarios men have been given the responsibility of being the initiator (asking someone out), planner (planning dates), and payer (paying for the dates) and proposer (proposing marriage). Women on the other hand are positioned as having a more limited scope of action and selectivity with regards of participation in the date. Sociologists studying dating scripts have also determined that much of the popular dating literature continues to reinforce traditional notions of masculinity (agency) and femininity (passive).

In a qualitative study of 38 college educated women, sociologist Ellen Lamont explored this dynamic further. She found that many of her participants supposed the concept of egalitarianism in terms of relationships but still felt that men needed to adhere to traditional courtship practices; i.e., ask them on dates, ask to "court" them, pay for the expenses associated with dates and lead the way with regards to progressing toward a long-term commitment, and propose marriage.

The chivalrous tradition is an example of gender norms in regards to what people expect others to do on their own when it comes to payment for dates. In a study of 17,607 unmarried heterosexual participants, Lever, Frederick, and Hertz indicated that most of the respondents agreed with paying for the date in more equal ways overtime. However, they also stated that the majority of participants still report men pay more than women. Therefore, the authors state this to be an inconsistency or conflict between what is considered the "traditional" way (chivalry) versus what is expected to be ideal (egalitarian).

Kuperberg and Padgett also analyzed a sample of 22,454 college and university students' surveys at 22 U.S. institutions. The results of their study demonstrate that the surveyed students experienced or participated in the social behaviors of hookups, dates, and long term relationships were influenced by variables including; sexual orientation, race, religious attendance, and involvement in Greek life. These results also provide evidence for how social norms (as opposed to an individual's personal preferences) shape the nature of intimate relationship formation.

=== In Marriage ===
Weekly hours dedicated to home production in US, by gender

Hours per week spent on child care, United States

The institution of marriage influences gender roles, inequality, and change. In the United States, the media, social interaction, and language communicate gender roles. Through these platforms, society has influenced individuals to fulfill from a young age the stereotypical gender roles in a heterosexual marriage. Spouses increasingly negotiate roles traditionally assigned by biological sex on an equal footing.

In the U.S., marriage roles are generally decided based on gender. For approximately the past seven decades, heterosexual marriage roles have been defined for men and women based on society's expectations and the influence of the media. Men and women are typically associated with certain social roles, dependent upon the personality traits associated with those roles. Traditionally, the role of the homemaker is associated with a woman, and the role of a breadwinner is associated with a male.

In the U.S., single men are outnumbered by single women at a ratio of 100 single women to 86 single men, though never-married men over the age of 15 outnumber women by a 5:4 ratio (33.9% to 27.3%) according to the 2006 U.S. Census American Community Survey. The results are varied between age groups, with 118 single men per 100 single women in their 20s, versus 33 single men to 100 single women over 65.

The numbers also vary between countries. For example, China has many more young men than young women, and this disparity is expected to increase. In regions with recent conflict, such as Chechnya, women greatly outnumber men.

In a cross-cultural study by David Buss, men and women were asked to rank the importance of certain traits in a long-term partner. Both men and women ranked "kindness" and "intelligence" as the two most important factors. Men valued beauty and youth more highly than women, while women valued financial and social status more highly than men.

Gendered roles in heterosexual marriages are learned through imitation. People learn what society views as appropriate gender behaviors from imitating the repetition of actions by one's role-model or parent of the same biological sex. Imitation in the physical world that impacts one's gendered roles often comes from role-modeling parents, peers, teachers, and other significant figures in one's life. In a marriage, each person's gendered roles are often determined by their parents. If the wife grew up imitating the actions of traditional parents and the husband those of non-traditional parents, their views on marital roles would differ. One way people can acquire these stereotypical roles is through a reward and punishment system. When a little girl imitates her mother by performing traditional domestic duties, she is often rewarded with praise for doing a good job. Nontraditionally, if a little boy were performing the same tasks, he would be more likely to be punished for acting feminine. Because society holds these expected roles for men and women within a marriage, it creates a mold for children to follow.

==== Changing gender roles in marriage ====
Over the years, gender roles have continued to change and have a significant impact on the institution of marriage. Traditionally, men and women had completely opposing roles; men were seen as the providers for the family, and women were seen as the caretakers of both the home and the family. However, in today's society, the division of roles is starting to blur. More and more individuals are adopting non-traditional gender roles in their marriages to share responsibilities. This view on gender roles seeks equality between the sexes. In today's society, it is more likely that a husband and wife are both providers for their family. More and more women are entering the workforce, while more men are contributing to household duties.

Around 1980, divorce rates in the United States stabilized. Scholars in the area of sociology explain that this stabilization was due to several factors including, but not limited to, the shift in gender roles. The attitude concerning the shift in gender roles can be classified into two perspectives: traditional and egalitarian. Traditional attitudes uphold designated responsibilities for the sexes – wives raise the children and keep the home nice, and husbands are the breadwinners. Egalitarian attitudes uphold the idea that responsibilities are carried out equally by both sexes – wives and husbands are both breadwinners, and they both take part in raising the children and keeping the home nice. Over the past 40 years, attitudes in marriages have become more egalitarian. Two studies carried out in the early 2000s have shown strong correlation between egalitarian attitudes and happiness and satisfaction in marriage, which scholars believe lead to stabilization in divorce rates. The results of a 2006 study conducted by Gayle Kaufman, a sociology professor, indicated that those who hold egalitarian attitudes report significantly higher levels of marital happiness than those with more traditional attitudes. Another study executed by Will Marshall in 2008 had results showing that relationships with better quality involve people with more egalitarian beliefs. It has been assumed by Danielle J. Lindemann, a sociologist who studies gender, sexuality, the family, and culture, that the shift in gender roles and egalitarian attitudes have resulted in marriage stability due to tasks being carried out by both partners, such as working late-nights and picking up ill children from school. Although the gap in gender roles still exists, roles have become less gendered and more equal in marriages compared to how they were traditionally.

=== Sexual orientation ===
Sexual orientation is defined by the interplay between a person's emotional and physical attraction toward others. Generally, sexual orientation is broken into three categories: heterosexual, homosexual, and bisexual. By basic definition, the term heterosexual is typically used in reference to someone who is attracted to people of the opposite sex, the term homosexual is used to classify people who are attracted to those of the same sex, and the term bisexual is used to identify those who are attracted to both the same and opposite sexes. Sexual orientation can be variously defined based on sexual identity, sexual behavior, and sexual attraction. People can fall anywhere on a spectrum from strictly heterosexual to strictly homosexual.

Scientists do not know the exact cause of sexual orientation, but they theorize that it is caused by a complex interplay of genetic, hormonal, and environmental influences, and do not view it as a choice. Although no single theory on the cause of sexual orientation has yet gained widespread support, scientists favor biologically based theories. There is considerably more evidence supporting nonsocial, biological causes of sexual orientation than social ones, especially for males. There is no substantive evidence which suggests parenting or early childhood experiences play a role with regard to sexual orientation.

An active conflict over the cultural acceptability of non-heterosexuality rages worldwide. The belief or assumption that heterosexual relationships and acts are "normal" is described as heterosexism or in queer theory, heteronormativity. Gender identity and sexual orientation are two separate aspects of individual identity, although they are often mistaken in the media.

Perhaps it is an attempt to reconcile this conflict that leads to a common assumption that one same-sex partner assumes a pseudo-male gender role and the other assumes a pseudo-female role. For a gay male relationship, this might lead to the assumption that the "wife" handled domestic chores, was the receptive sexual partner, adopted effeminate mannerisms, and perhaps even dressed in women's clothing. This assumption is flawed because homosexual couples tend to have more equal roles; the effeminate behavior of some gay men is usually not adopted consciously, but is often more subtle.

Cohabitating same-sex partners are typically egalitarian when they assign domestic chores. Sometimes these couples assign traditional female responsibilities to one partner and traditional male responsibilities to the other. Same-sex domestic partners challenge traditional gender roles in their division of household responsibilities, and gender roles within homosexual relationships are flexible. For instance, cleaning and cooking, traditionally regarded by many as female responsibilities, might be assigned to different people. Masculine women may take on traditionally male and female roles within the house, depending on their family's needs. Carrington observed the daily home lives of 52 gay and lesbian couples and found that the length of the work week and level of earning power substantially affected the assignment of housework, regardless of gender or sexuality.

In many cultures, gender roles, especially for men, simultaneously act as an indicator of heterosexuality and as a boundary of acceptable behavior for straight people. Therefore, lesbians, gay men, and bisexual people may be viewed as exempt from some or all components of gender roles or as having different "rules" they are expected to follow by society.

These modified "rules" for lesbian, gay, and bisexual people may also be oppressive. Morgan examines the plight of homosexuals seeking asylum from homophobic persecution who US customs have turned away for "not being gay enough:" not conforming sufficiently to standard (Western) conceptions of the gender roles occupied by gays and lesbians.

Liberation from gender roles and norms also works to enforce them. To be consciously existing outside of a gender role means to acknowledge its existence constantly. Therefore, although gay couples do not exhibit gender roles in the same way as a heterosexual couple would, they are not free from gender roles. They still exist in a society that upholds those roles, making their diversion notable. Because gender roles and sexuality are closely related, where sexuality is seen as diverse or fluid, gender roles could also be seen as such. However, true fluidity would require reframing gender within society.

Conversely, heterosexual men and women who are not perceived as being sufficiently masculine or feminine, respectively, may be assumed to be homosexual and persecuted for their perceived homosexuality. In his book Female Masculinity, Jack Halberstam attributes this to the multiple possible masculinities embodied by women and men. Almost no one rigidly follows gender roles and gender norms, but we still consider there to be only two genders. That leads to the punishment of those who do not fit into our typical ideas of masculine and feminine.

== Communication ==
Gender communication is viewed as a form of intercultural communication, and gender is both an influence on and a product of communication.

Communication plays a large role in the process of people becoming male or female because each gender is taught different linguistic practices. Gender is dictated by society through expectations of behavior and appearance, and is then shared from one person to another through communication. Gender does not create communication, communication creates gender.

For example, females are often more expressive and intuitive in their communication, but males tend to be instrumental and competitive. In addition, there are differences in accepted communication behaviors for males and females. To improve communication between genders, people who identify as male or female must understand the differences between them.

As found by Cara Tigue (McMaster University in Hamilton, Canada), the importance of powerful vocal delivery for women in leadership could not be underestimated, as famously described in accounts of Margaret Thatcher's years in power.

=== Nonverbal communication ===
Hall published an observational study on nonverbal gender differences and discussed the cultural reasons behind them. In her study, she noted women smile and laugh more and have a better understanding of nonverbal cues. She believed women were encouraged to be more emotionally expressive in their language, leading them to develop more in nonverbal communication.

Men, on the other hand, were taught to be less expressive, to suppress their emotions, and to be less nonverbally active in communication, using nonverbal cues more sporadically. Most studies on nonverbal communication described women as more expressive and more judgmentally accurate in nonverbal communication when it was linked to emotional expression; other nonverbal expressions were similar or the same for both genders.

McQuiston and Morris also noted a major difference in men's and women's nonverbal communication. They found that men tend to show body language linked to dominance, like eye contact and interpersonal distance, more than women.

=== Communication and gender cultures ===
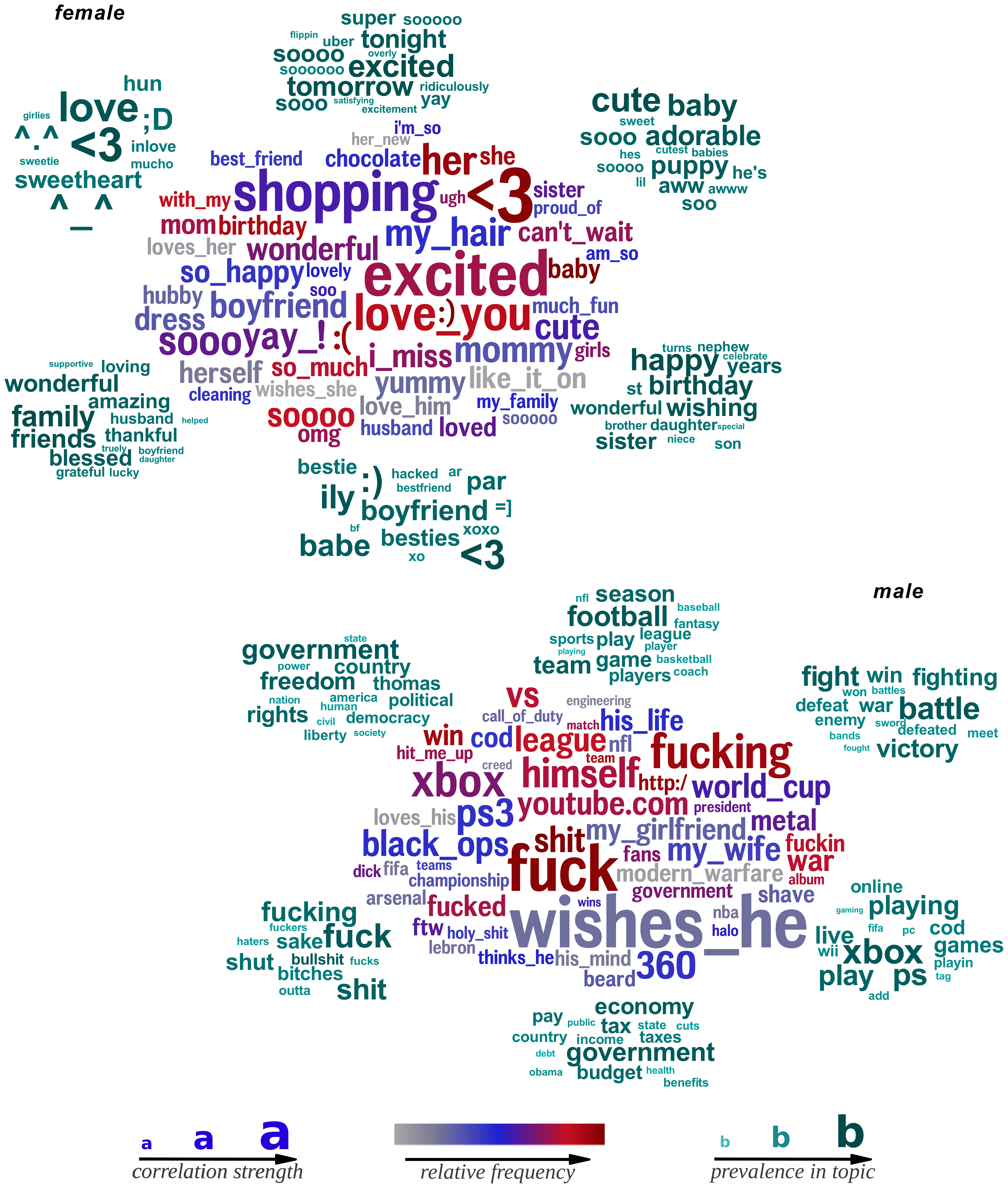
Words, phrases, and topics most highly distinguishing English-speaking females and males in social media in 2013

According to author Julia Wood, there are distinct communication 'cultures' for women and men in the US. She believes that in addition to female and male communication cultures, there are also specific communication cultures for African Americans, older people, Native Americans, gay men, lesbians, and people with disabilities. According to Wood, it is generally thought that biological sex is behind the distinct ways of communicating, but in her opinion, the root of these differences is gender.

Maltz and Borker's research suggested that the games children play may contribute to socializing children into masculine and feminine gender roles: for example, girls being encouraged to play "house" may promote stereotypically feminine traits, and may promote interpersonal relationships, as playing house does not necessarily have fixed rules or objectives; boys tend to play more competitive and adversarial team sports with structured, predetermined goals and a range of confined strategies.

== In religion ==
Different religious and cultural groups within one country may have different norms that they attempt to "police" within their own groups, including gender norms.

=== Christianity ===
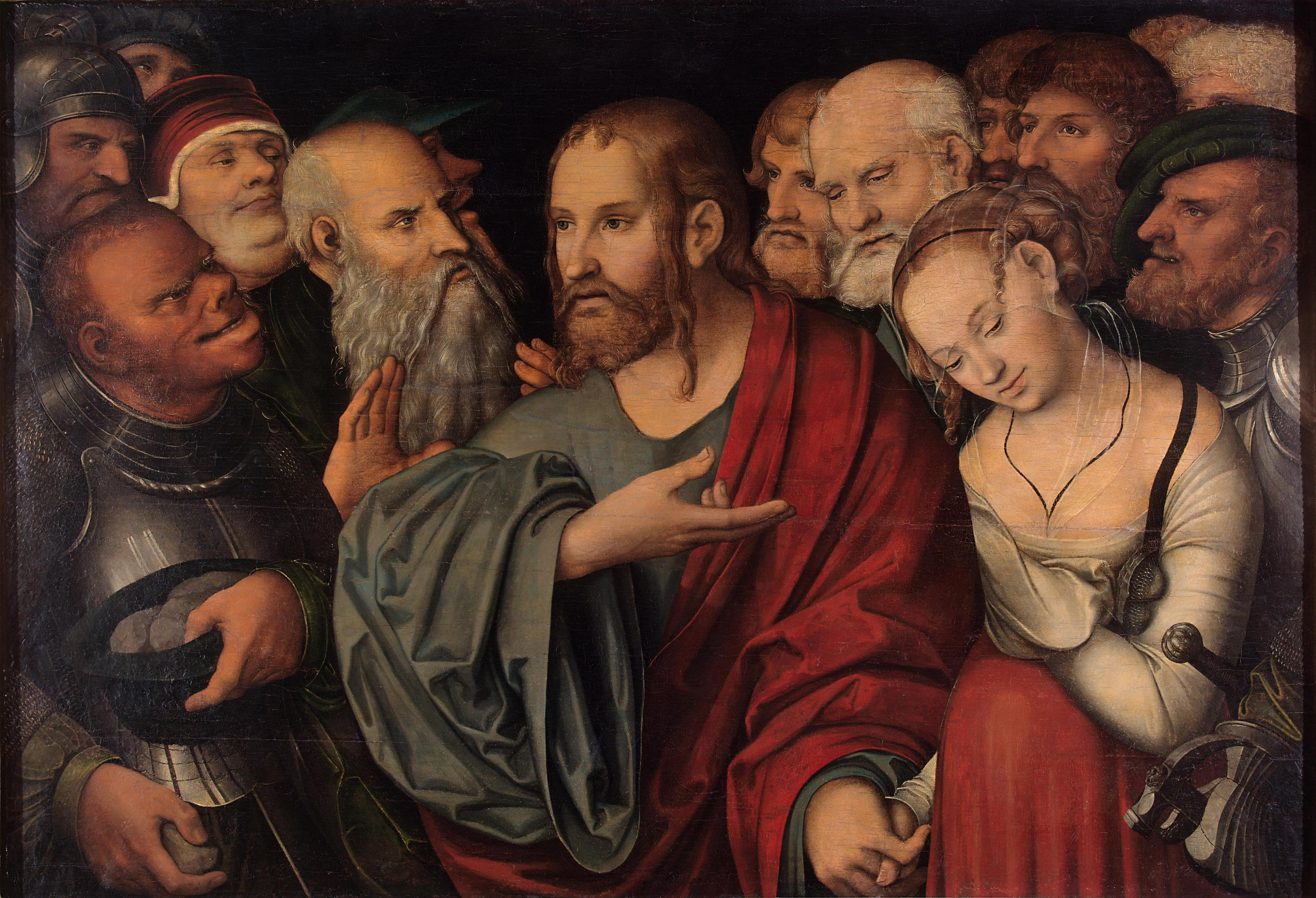
Christ and the Woman Taken in Adultery Hermitage Museum, Russia

The roles of women in Christianity can vary considerably today (as they have historically since the first-century church). This is especially true in marriage and in formal ministry positions within certain Christian denominations, churches, and parachurch organizations.

Many leadership roles in the organized church have been restricted to males. In the Roman Catholic and Eastern Orthodox churches, only men may serve as priests or deacons, and in senior leadership positions such as pope, patriarch, and bishop. Women may serve as abbesses. Some mainstream Protestant denominations are beginning to allow women to hold historically male specific leadership roles , though some large groups are increasing their constraints in response. Many subsets of the Charismatic and Pentecostal movements have permitted the ordination of women since their founding.

Christian "saints", persons of exceptional holiness of life having attained the beatific vision (heaven), can include female saints. Most prominent is Mary, mother of Jesus who is highly revered throughout Christianity, particularly in the Catholic and Orthodox churches where she is considered the "Theotokos", i.e., "Mother of God". Women prominent in Christianity have included contemporaries of Jesus, subsequent theologians, abbesses, mystics, doctors of the church, founders of religious orders, military leaders, monarchs, and martyrs, evidencing the variety of roles women have played within the life of Christianity. Paul the Apostle held women in high regard and worthy of prominent positions in the church. However, he was careful not to encourage disregard for the New Testament household codes, also known as New Testament Domestic Codes or Haustafelen, of Greco-Roman law in the first century.

A 2024 study used critical collaborative autoethnography to determine that people's experiences with their sexuality and gender were consistent with their religious upbringing. This confirmed the authors' hypothesis that queer, gender, and religious socialization impacted identity development.

=== Islam ===
According to Dhami and Sheikh, gender roles in Muslim countries are centered on the importance of the family unit, which is viewed as the basis of a balanced and healthy society. Islamic views on gender roles and family are traditionally conservative.

Many Muslim-majority countries, most prominently Saudi Arabia, have interpretations of religious doctrine regarding gender roles embedded in their laws. In the United Arab Emirates, non-Muslim Western women can wear crop tops, whereas Muslim women are expected to dress much more modestly when in public. In some Muslim countries, these differences are sometimes even codified in law.

In some Muslim-majority countries, even non-Muslim women are expected to follow Muslim female gender norms and Islamic law to a certain extent, such as by covering their hair. (Women visiting from other countries sometimes object to this norm and sometimes decide to comply on pragmatic grounds, in the interest of their own safety, such as "modest" dress codes, which failing to abide by risk being perceived as a prostitute.)

Islamic prophet Muhammad described the high status of mothers in both of the major hadith collections (Bukhari and Muslim). One famous account is:

"A man asked the Prophet: 'Whom should I honor most?' The Prophet replied: 'Your mother'. 'And who comes next?' asked the man. The Prophet replied: 'Your mother'. 'And who comes next?' asked the man. The Prophet replied: 'Your mother!'. 'And who comes next?' asked the man. The Prophet replied: 'Your father!'"

The Qur'an prescribes that the status of a woman should be nearly as high as that of a man.

How gender roles are honored is largely a matter of culture. While some cultures encourage men and women to take on the same roles, others promote a more traditional, less dominant role for women.

=== Hinduism ===
Hindu deities are more ambiguously gendered than the deities of other world religions. This informs relations between females and males and how the differences between males and females are understood.

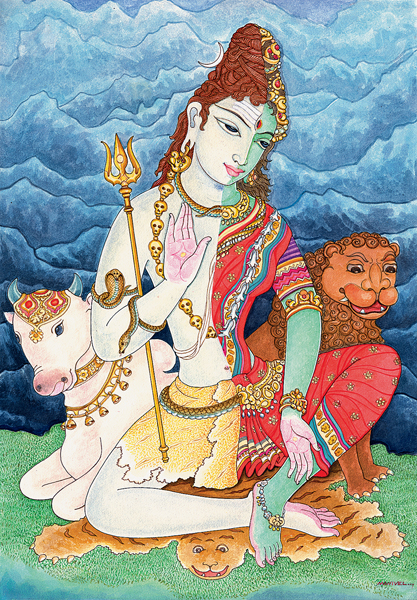
Image of Ardhanarishvara

However, in a religious cosmology like Hinduism, which prominently features female and androgynous deities, some gender transgression is allowed. This group is known as the hijras and has a long tradition of performing at important rituals, such as the births of sons and weddings. Despite this allowance for transgression, Hindu cultural traditions portray women in contradictory ways. Women's fertility is given great value, but female sexuality is depicted as potentially dangerous and destructive.

== In the military ==
Short film about the Women Airforce Service Pilots in the United States, produced in 1943 as part of the series Army–Navy Screen Magazine

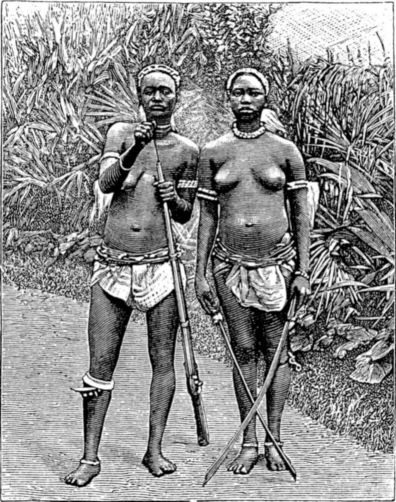
From approximately 1700 through 1900, women served as soldiers for the kingdom of Dahomey.

Women have been serving in the military since the inception of organized warfare, in both combat and non-combat roles, including leading armies. Their inclusion in combat missions has increased in recent decades, often serving as pilots, mechanics, and infantry officers. Women's service in the military is often optional, while men are more likely to be subject to conscription.

Since 1914, women have been conscripted in greater numbers, filling a greater variety of roles in Western militaries. In the 1970s, most Western armies began allowing women to serve on active duty in all military branches.

As of 2025, twelve countries (China, Denmark, Eritrea, Israel, Libya, Malaysia, the Netherlands, North Korea, Norway, Peru, Sweden, and Taiwan) conscript women into military service. Of these countries, only four conscript women and men on the same formal conditions: Denmark, the Netherlands, Norway, and Sweden. A few other countries have laws allowing for the conscription of women into their armed forces, though with some differences such as service exemptions, length of service, and more.

== In the workplace ==
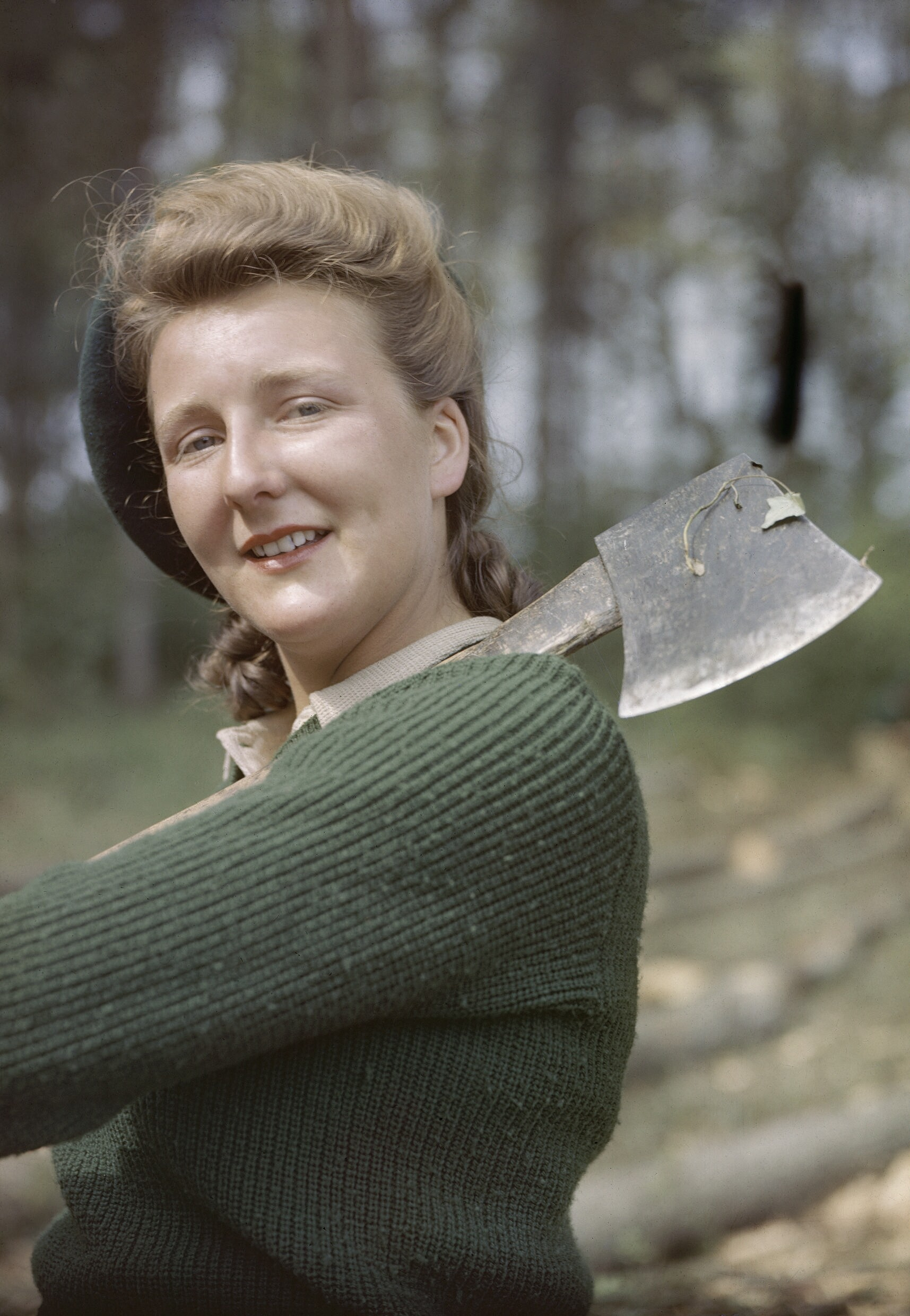
A female lumberjack on the home front during World War II. The gendered mass-mobilization for military service created many opportunities for women to work in traditionally male jobs.

Gender stereotypes can disadvantage women during the hiring process. It is one explanation for the lack of women in key organizational positions. Gender stereotypes have been linked to bias and discrimination in the workplace, which affect hiring, performance, and promotion, often to the detriment of women in male-dominated work environments. The impact of gender stereotypes also extends to how people view women in leadership positions. In studies carried out among military personnel, contact with female leaders was found to generate favorable opinions about women. Management and similar leader positions are often perceived to be "masculine" in type, meaning they are assumed to require aggressiveness, competitiveness, strength and independence. These traits do not line up with the perceived traditional female gender role stereotype. (This is often referred to as the "lack of fit" model which describes the dynamics of the gender bias.) Therefore, the perception that women do not possess these "masculine" qualities limits their ability to be hired or promoted into managerial positions.

One's performance at work is also evaluated based on one's gender. If a female and a male worker show the same performance, the implications of that performance vary depending on the person's gender and on who observes the performance; if a man performs exceedingly well, he is perceived as driven or goal-oriented and generally seen in a positive light, while a woman showing a similar performance is often described using adjectives with negative connotations. Female performance is therefore not evaluated neutrally or unbiased and stereotyped in ways to deem their equivalent levels and quality of work as instead of lesser value.

A study in 2001 found that if a woman does act according to female stereotypes, she is likely to receive backlash for not being competent enough; if she does not act according to the stereotypes connected to her gender and behaves more masculine, it is likely to cause backlash through third-party punishment or further job discrimination. This puts women in the workforce in a precarious, "double bind" situation. A proposed step to protect women is the ratification of the Equal Rights Amendment, as it would prohibit gender-based discrimination regardless of whether a woman is acting according to female gender stereotypes, or in defiance of them.

Consequently, that gender stereotype filter leads to a lack of fair evaluation and, in turn, to fewer women occupying higher-paying positions. Gender stereotypes contain women at certain, lower levels, getting trapped within the glass ceiling. While the number of women in the workforce occupying management positions is slowly increasing, women currently fill only 2.5% of the higher managerial positions in the United States. The fact that most women are being allocated to occupations that pay less, is often cited as a contributor to the existing gender pay gap. In the United States gender pay gap has decreased throughout the years, but it continues to exists, with women earning less than men on average in many jobs.

In relation to white women, women of color are disproportionally affected by the negative influence their gender has on their chances in the labor market. In 2005, women held only 14.7% of Fortune 500 board seats, with 79% of them being white and 21% being women of color. This difference is understood through intersectionality, a term describing the multiple and intersecting oppressions an individual might experience. Activists during second-wave feminism have also used the term "horizontal oppressions" to describe this phenomenon. It has also been suggested that women of color, in addition to the glass ceiling, face a "concrete wall" or a "sticky floor" to visualize the barriers better.

A 2025 study found that women were subjected to gender stereotype threat in the workplace when the leaders were people who identified as men. The authors conducted a three-part study to prove this. The results collectively showed that leaders' behaviors were positively correlated with gender stereotype threat in the workplace.

Liberal feminist theory states that due to these systemic factors of oppression and discrimination, women are often deprived of equal work experiences because they are not provided equal opportunities based on legal rights. Liberal feminists further propose that an end needs to be put to discrimination based on gender through legal means, leading to equality and major economic redistributions.

While activists have tried to invoke Title VII of the Civil Rights Act of 1964 to ensure an equal hiring and promotion process, that practice has had limited success. The pay gap between men and women is slowly closing. Women make approximately 21% less than their male counterparts, according to the Department of Labor. This number varies by age, race, and other perceived attributes of hiring agents. A proposed step towards addressing the gender pay gap and unequal work opportunities is the ratification of the Equal Rights Amendment, which would constitutionally guarantee equal rights for women. Recent statistics show that despite the progress made in the educational and labor arenas, women still face many challenges in areas such as earnings, leadership positions, and caregiving. This is hoped to end gender-based discrimination and provide equal opportunities for women.

== In sports ==
As strength has been strongly associated with masculinity for many years, sports have evolved into a significant representation of expressions of masculinity and hence, are commonly perceived as a predominantly male domain. However, this does not completely neglect the position and role of women in sports. This is evident from the increase in the number of females participating in sports in recent years.

As the belief in gender stereotypes is continuously upheld in society, sporting events have been divided according to how the sport is characterised, which leads to the conceptualisation of male and female sports. Certain traits and sporting events in the sport domain have conventionally been attributed to males and the rest to females. Female sports that express concepts of femininity are often characterised by flexibility and balance, such as gymnastics and aesthetic sports like dance. Conversely, male sports embody the idea of masculinity, portrayed through strength, speed, aggression, and power, as in football and basketball.

The element of beauty in women's sport seems to play a crucial role in its perceived femininity. This could be due to it being a vital facet in the general concept of femininity itself. The objectification of the female form persists, with women being conditioned to utilize their bodies for the satisfaction of others and to measure their looks against the prevailing feminine standard. The devaluation of female athleticism due their bodies can be seen in the sport uniforms, where in some sports, such as beach volleyball, gymnastics and figure skating, males and females don different uniforms in competitions. In the aforementioned sports, female uniforms expose more of the body than male uniforms do, despite a lack of evidence that such uniforms would significantly improve their skills.

While the distinction between male and female sports exists, female participation in male sports is more socially acceptable than the reverse, as questions would arise about the masculinity of males competing in female sports. In a study conducted by Klomsten et al. (2005), they discovered that a majority of the females believed that certain sports are better suited for girls than for boys. Hence, they inferred that females do not prefer the idea of males, known to be strong and masculine, participating in feminine sports.

Sport media coverage of males and females differs significantly, and this could be attributed to the perpetuation of stereotypical gender roles as well as adversely influencing perceptions of women's abilities. Male athletes are often portrayed based on their strength and physical prowess, while female athletes are more frequently depicted in relation to their physical attractiveness and, at times, their sexualized attributes.

Despite the increasing participation and remarkable achievements of female athletes, media coverage of women's sport has yet to catch up with this significant advancement. Female athletes and women's sport receive notably less media attention compared to their male counterparts across various forms of media, and this underrepresentation has worsened over the years, despite the rising levels of female participation and performance.

The depiction of female athletes and women's sports in the media also tends to vary in tone and production quality, often minimising their efforts and performance. One prevalent practice in sport media coverage is the use of gender marking. The presentation of male athletes and men's sport is regarded as the standard, while their female counterparts are often considered as the "other" or outside of this norm, as seen in the naming of events, such as "Women's World Cup" while the men's event being simply named as the "World Cup". The use of first names and being referred to as "girls" or "young ladies" for female athletes is also seen as infantilizing, which reinforces the lower regard for female athletes and perpetuates pre-existing negative perceptions of women's sport. The quality of production and filming of men's and women's sport, such as the use of on-screen graphics, shot variations, duration of video frames, and camera angles, is also significantly distinct. This influences the audience's perceptions by illustrating women's sport as less significant and engaging. Thus, female athletes not only face a lack of media coverage, but the little amount of coverage tends to reinforce the hegemonic masculinity present in sport.

While online sites that promote and cover female athletes exist, these coverages are primarily only found in "niche" sites, which continues to pose challenges in overcoming the prevailing ideology of hegemonic masculinity deeply rooted in sports. Therefore, despite the growing participation and athletic achievements of girls and women, female athletes and women's sports still yet to achieve equal treatment and fair representation in sports media coverage.

== In media ==
In today's society, the media saturates nearly every aspect of one's life. It seems inevitable for society to be influenced by the media and what it is portraying. Roles are gendered, meaning that both males and females are viewed and treated differently according to biological sex, and because gendered roles are learned, the media has a direct impact on individuals. Thinking about the way in which couples act on romantic television shows or movies and the way women are portrayed as passive in magazine ads, reveals a lot about how gender roles are viewed in society and in heterosexual marriages. Traditional gendered roles view the man as a "pro-creator, a protector, and a provider," and the woman as "pretty and polite but not too aggressive, not too outspoken and not too smart." Media aids in society conforming to these traditional gendered views. People learn through imitation and social interaction, both in the physical world and through the media; television, magazines, advertisements, newspapers, the Internet, etc. Michael Messner argues that "gendered interactions, structure, and cultural meanings are intertwined, in both mutually reinforcing and contradictory ways."

Women are also largely underrepresented across multiple media types. A statistical disparity of the male to female ratio shown on television has existed for decades and is constantly changing and improving. Three decades ago findings highlight that males outnumbered females on a ratio of 2.5 to 1. A decade later this number was at 1.66 men for every woman, and in 2008 the ratio was 1.2 to 1 in the US. In 2010 it was found that the ratio of men to women in successful G-rate movies is 2.57 to 1. Notable social theory such as Bandura's social cognitive theory highlights the importance of seeing people in media that are similar to oneself. In other words, it is valuable for girls to see similarities to those represented in the media.

Television's influence on society, specifically that of television advertisements, is shown in studies such as those by Jörg Matthes, Michael Prieler, and Karoline Adam. Their study of television advertising has shown that women are much more likely to be shown in a home setting than men. The study also shows that women are shown much less in work-like settings. This underrepresentation in television advertising is seen in many countries around the world, but is very present in developed countries. In another study in the Journal of Social Psychology, many television advertisements in countries around the world are seen targeting women at different times of the day than men. Advertisements for products directed at female viewers are shown during weekdays, while those for men are shown on weekends. The same article reports that a study of adults and television media found that the more television adults watch, the more likely they are to believe in or support the gender roles illustrated. The support of the presented gender stereotypes can lead to a negative view of feminism or sexual aggression.

It has been reported in a journal article by Emerald Group Publishing Limited that adolescent girls have been affected by stereotypical portrayals of women in media. Girls feel pressured and stressed to achieve a particular appearance, and there have been negative consequences for young girls who fail to achieve this look. These consequences have ranged from anxiety to eating disorders. In an experiment described in this journal article, young girls described pictures of women in advertisements as unrealistic and fake; the women were dressed in revealing clothing, which sexualised them and exposed their thin figures, which were gazed upon by the public, creating an issue with stereotyping in the media.

It has also been presented that children are affected by gender roles in the media. Children's preferences in television characters are most likely to be for characters of the same gender. Because children favor characters of the same gender, the characteristics of the character are also looked to by children. Another journal article by Emerald Group Publishing Limited examined the underrepresentation of women in children's television shows between 1930 and 1960. While studies between 1960 and 1990 showed an increase in the representation of women in television, studies conducted between 1990 and 2005, a time when some considered women equal to men, show no change in the representation of women in children's television shows. Women, being underrepresented in children's television shows, are also often portrayed as married or in a relationship, while men are more likely to be single. This recurring theme in relationship status can be reflected in the ideals of children who only see this type of representation.

=== Gender roles in social media ===
Social media platforms have become important sites for the construction and circulation of gender norms. Visibility and engagement metrics along with algorithmic decision making on platforms may influence how individuals present and are evaluated on gender identities. Perceptions propagated through social media significantly shape real-life thinking and opinions regarding gender. According to professor Brook Duffy at Cornell University, social media operates as a meritocracy, yet women's voices are often underrepresented and carry less weight in the public sphere.

Social media can also contribute to gendered expectations about appearance, behavior, and self-presentation. Online identity formation may reinforce idealized or unrealistic standards for both women and men, particularly through images related to beauty, fitness, fashion, relationships and sexuality. Body image plays a significant role in this, particularly affecting the mental health of young women and men who internalize beauty standards portrayed online, leading to dissatisfaction and harassment. A 2024 qualitative study of young social media users in Spain found that adolescent girls more often described pressure regarding appearance, clothing, beauty standards and self-image on platforms such as Instagram and TikTok, while boys were much more likely to discuss fun, self-affirmation and social status. A survey conducted by the Pew Research Center also found that women are more likely to have multiple social media accounts, making them more likely to internalize their body image and be influenced by the cultural stereotypes of female beauty. The emphasis on body image on social media platforms fosters daily comparisons and exposes individuals to sexualized media, increasing self-image insecurity. Furthermore, social media has also contributed to the spread of sexist beliefs and sexualized images of men. However, hashtags like #loveyourself and #allbodiesarebeautiful have sparked movements to challenge these standards.

Research has also examined the relationship between social media, gender roles, and attitudes toward sexual violence. A 2025 study on rape myths in media assessed how an individual's exposure to social media content (or posts) concerning rape myths is associated with that person's acceptance of rape myths. The study used a survey method of 662 participants to assess their demographics as well as their level of rape myth acceptance using the Illinois Rape Myth Acceptance Scale. The participants answered survey questions about their gender, race/ethnicity, and age, and reported differences related to gender or political affiliation and randomization.

Despite these challenges, social media has also created new opportunities for women in the workplace, particularly as influencers. However, gender disparities persist, with male influencers generally outperforming their female counterparts. Additionally, media content across various platforms perpetuates gender stereotypes, with women often portrayed in cosmetic and fashion advertisements, while men are associated with gaming and knowledge. On an economic aspect, social media is driven by gendered advertisements and commercials, often reinforcing stereotypical representations of gender. Algorithms on social media platforms can further exacerbate discriminatory recommendations, reflecting programmers' biases. Overall, social media reflects and shapes gender roles by influencing how gender is represented, evaluated, and monetized online.

== Online ==
An example of gender stereotypes assumes those of the male gender are more 'tech savvy' and happier working online, however, a study done by Hargittai & Shafer, shows that many women also typically have lower self-perceived abilities when it comes to use of the World Wide Web and online navigation skills. Because this stereotype is so well known, many women assume they lack such technical skills when, in reality, the gap in technological skill level between men and women is significantly less than many women assume.

In the journal article written by Elizabeth Behm-Morawitz, video games have been guilty of using sexualised female characters, who wear revealing clothing with an 'ideal' figure. It has been shown that female gamers can experience lower self-efficacy when playing a game with a sexualized female character. Women have been stereotyped in online games and are often portrayed as quite sexist in their appearances. It has been shown that these kinds of character appearances have influenced people's beliefs about gender capabilities by assigning certain qualities to the male and female characters in different games.

The concept of gender inequality is often perceived as something non-existent within the online community, because of the anonymity possible online. Remote or home-working greatly reduces the volume of information one individual gives another compared to face-to-face encounters, providing fewer opportunities for unequal treatment but it seems real-world notions of power and privilege are being duplicated: people who choose to take up different identities (avatars) in the online world are (still) routinely discriminated against, evident in online gaming where users can create their own characters. This freedom allows the user to create characters and identities with appearances different from their own in reality, effectively enabling them to adopt a new identity, confirming that, regardless of actual gender, those perceived as female are treated differently.

In contrast to the stereotype that gamers are mostly male, a 2014 study of U.K. residents found that 52% of the gaming audience was women. The study counted players of mobile games as part of the gaming audience, but still found that 56% of female gamers had played on a console. However, only 12% of game designers in Britain and 3% of all programmers were women.

Despite the growing number of women who partake in online communities and the anonymous space provided by the Internet, issues such as gender inequality have been transplanted into the online world.

== In criminal justice ==
Several studies conducted since the mid-90s have found a direct correlation between a female criminal's ability to conform to gender role stereotypes and the severity of her sentencing, particularly among female murderers. "In terms of the social realities of justice in America, the experiences of diverse groups of people in society have contributed to the shaping of the types of criminals and victims that we have had. Like Andersen and Hill Collins (1998: 4) in their discussion of what they refer to as a 'matrix of domination,' we too conceive that class, race, and gender represent "multiple, interlocking levels of domination that stem from the societal configurations of these structural relationships. These patterned actions, in turn, affecting individual consciousness, group interaction, and individual and group access to institutional power and privileges.'" "Patterns of offending by men and by women are notable both for their similarities and for their differences. Both men and women are more heavily involved in minor property and substance abuse offenses than in serious crimes like robbery or murder. However, men offend at much higher rates than women for all crime categories except prostitution. This gender gap in crime is greatest for serious crime and least for mild forms of lawbreaking such as minor property crimes."

=== Gender roles in family violence ===
The 'Family Violence Framework' applies gender dynamics to family violence. "Families are constructed around relationships that involve obligations and responsibilities, but also status and power". According to Hattery and Smith, when "masculinity and femininity are constructed...to generate these rigid and narrow gender roles, it contributes to a culture of violence against women" "People with more resources are more likely to be abusive towards those without resources", meaning that the stronger member of the relationship abuses the weaker partner or family member. However, the fight for power and equality remains – "Intimate partner violence in same-sex couples reveals that the rates are similar to those in the heterosexual community".

== In economy and society ==
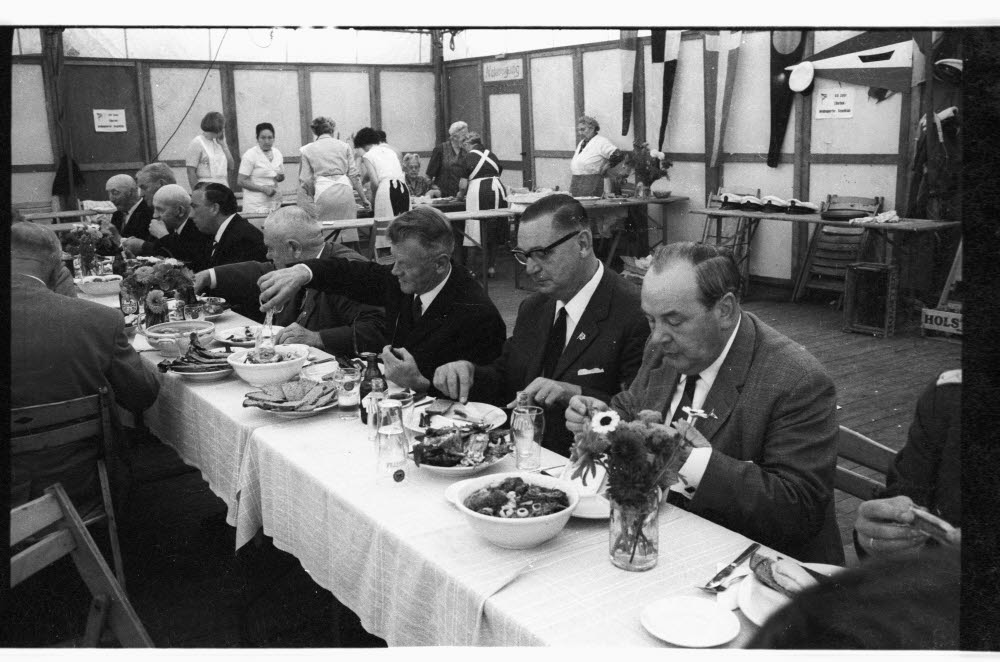
A meal prepared by women and eaten by men in West Germany, 1966

Traditional gender roles assume women will serve as the primary caregivers for children and older adults, regardless of whether they also work outside of the home. Sociology scholar Arlie Hochschild delves into this phenomenon in her book, The Second Shift. This "second shift" refers to the unpaid work women take on in the private sphere—housework, cooking, cleaning, and caring for the family unit. Economically, this restricts a women's ability to advance in her career due to her added (unpaid) responsibilities at home. Gender roles have reinforced the idea that women are well-suited to more feminine roles, such as housekeeping and domestic duties. The OECD found "Around the world, women spend two to ten times more time on unpaid care work than men." In 2020 alone, women provided over $689 billion in unpaid labor to the U.S. economy. Lee and Fang found, "Compared with Whites, Blacks, Hispanics, and Asian Americans took more extensive caregiving responsibilities."

Across all demographics, women are more likely to live in poverty compared to men. This is largely due to the gender wage gap between men and women. Correcting these wage gaps would raise women's average annual earnings from $41,402 to $48,326, increasing the income of the U.S. economy. The gender wage gap is largely racial—in the U.S., American Indian and Alaska Native (AIAN) women, Black women, and Latina women disproportionately experience poverty and larger wage gaps compared with White and Asian women. Women are also more likely to live in poverty if they are single mothers and solely responsible for providing for their children. Poverty among single working mothers would fall 40% or more if women earned equal wages to men.

Specifically, in the immigrant demographic, migrant women are subject to lesser benefits and wage gaps compared to what migrant men receive. From 1984 to 1994–2004, Mexican migrant women earned $6.00 to $7.40 per hour while managing unpaid domestic responsibilities. Similarly, gender roles apply for immigrant women in the workplace as their skill level does not guarantee equitable participation in the economy. The 1986 immigration policy, impacted the employment of migrant men and women, specifically women with lower wages and higher demands. This trend continued in the United States, as immigration policy has persistently been grouped by political affiliation alongside various other social, economic, and geographical factors.

The saving rate can differ by gender, with a 2010 study finding lower saving, lower financial literacy and higher risk aversion for women in the United States.

== In politics ==
=== Political ideologies ===
Modern social conservatives tend to support traditional gender roles. Right wing political parties often oppose women's rights and transgender rights. These familialist views are often shaped by the religious fundamentalism, traditional family values, and cultural values of their voter base.

Modern social liberals tend to oppose traditional gender roles, especially for women. Left wing political parties tend to support women's rights and transgender rights. In contrast to social conservatives, their views are more influenced by secularism, feminism, and progressivism.

=== In political office ===
Even though the number of women running for elected office in the United States has increased over the last few decades, they still only make up 20% of U.S. senators, 19.4% of U.S. congressional representatives, and 24% of statewide executives. Additionally, many of these political campaigns appear to focus on the aggressiveness of the female candidate, which is often still perceived as a masculine trait. Therefore, female candidates are running based on gender-opposing stereotypes because that predicts higher likelihood of success than appearing to be a stereotypical woman.

The increasing number of women elected to office provides many scholars with grounds to claim that voters are not biased against a candidate's gender. However, it has been shown that female politicians are perceived as only being superior when it comes to handling women's rights and poverty, whereas male politicians are perceived to be better at dealing with crime and foreign affairs. That view lines up with the most common gender stereotypes.

It has also been predicted that gender highly matters only for female candidates who have not been politically established. These predictions also apply to established candidates, stating that gender would not be a defining factor in their campaigns or the focal point of media coverage. This has been refuted by multiple scholars, often based on Hillary Clinton's multiple campaigns for the office of President of the United States.

Additionally, when voters have little information about a female candidate, they are likely to view her as being a stereotypical woman which they often take as a basis for not electing her because they consider typical male qualities as being crucial for someone holding a political office.

=== Feminism and women's rights ===
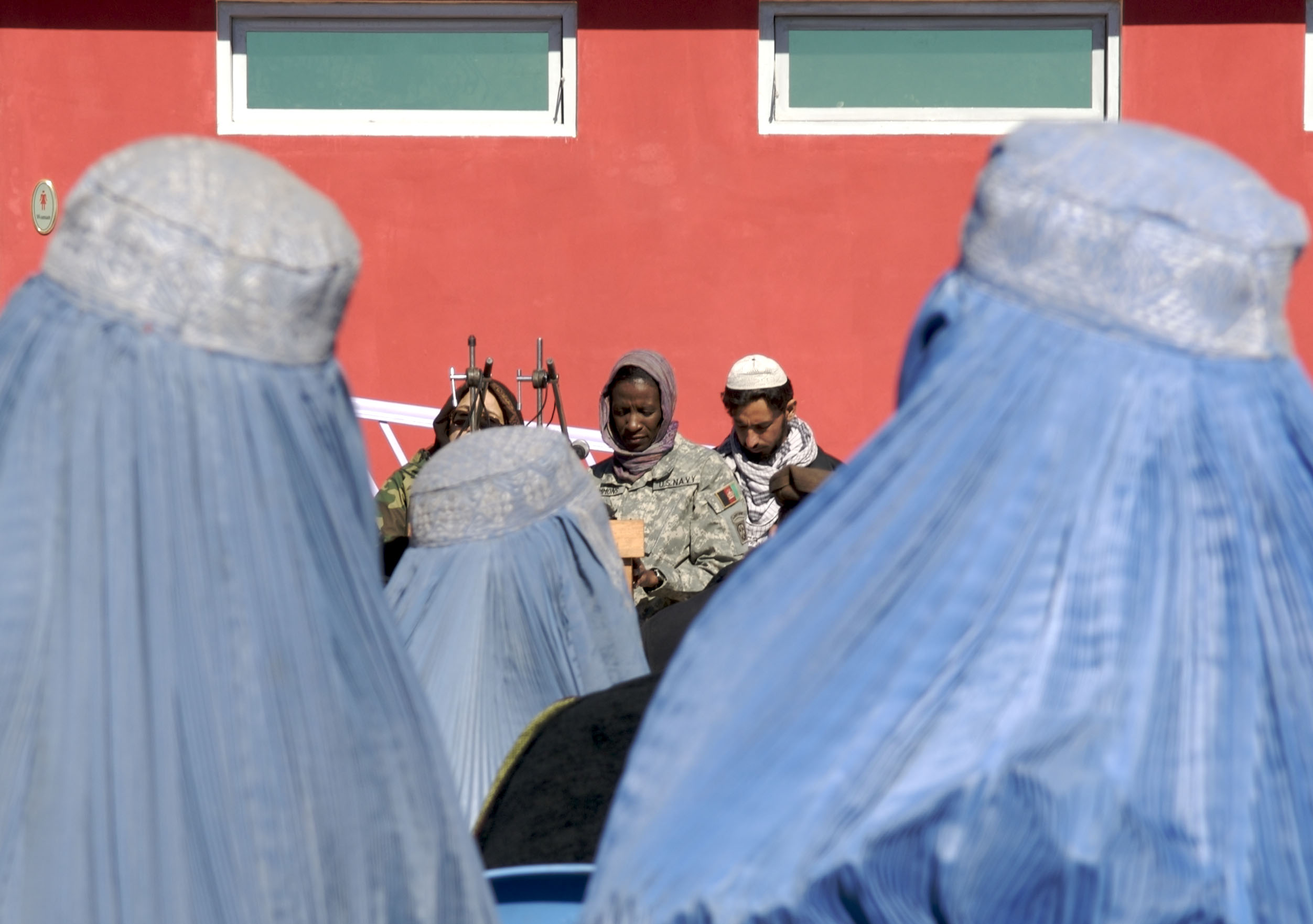
Cmdr. Adrienne Simmons speaking at the 2008 ceremony for the only women's mosque in Khost City, a symbol of progress for growing women's rights in the Pashtun belt.

Throughout the 20th century, women in the United States saw a dramatic shift in social and professional aspirations and norms. Following the Women's Suffrage Movement of the late-nineteenth century, which resulted in the passage of the Nineteenth Amendment allowing women to vote, and in combination with conflicts in Europe, WWI and WWII, women found themselves shifted into the industrial workforce. During this time, women were expected to take up industrial jobs and support the troops abroad through domestic industry. Moving from "homemakers" and "caregivers", women were now factory workers and "breadwinners" for the family.

However, after the war, men returned home to the United States, and women, again, saw a shift in social and professional dynamics. With the reuniting of the nuclear family, the ideals of American Suburbia boomed. Throughout the 1950s and 1960s, middle-class families moved in droves from urban living into newly developed single-family homes on former farmland just outside major cities. Thus, established what many modern critics describe as the "private sphere". Though frequently sold and idealized as "perfect living", many women had difficulty adjusting to the new "private sphere". Writer Betty Friedan described this discontent as "the feminine mystique". The "mystique" was derived from women equipped with the knowledge, skills, and aspirations of the workforce, the "public sphere", who felt compelled, whether socially or morally, to devote themselves to the home and family.

One major concern of feminism is that women occupy lower-ranking job positions than men and do most of the housework. A recent (October 2009) report from the Center for American Progress, "The Shriver Report: A Woman's Nation Changes Everything" tells us that women now make up 48% of the US workforce and "mothers are breadwinners or co-breadwinners in a majority of families" (63.3%, see figure 2, page 19 of the Executive Summary of The Shriver Report).

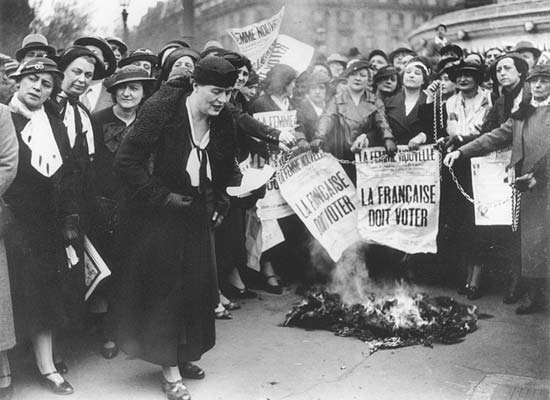
Louise Weiss along with other Parisian suffragettes in 1935. The newspaper headline reads "The Frenchwoman Must Vote".

Another recent article in The New York Times indicates that young women today are closing the pay gap. Luisita Lopez Torregrosa has noted, "Women are ahead of men in education (last year, 55 percent of U.S. college graduates were female). And a study shows that in most U.S. cities, single, childless women under 30 are making an average of 8 percent more money than their male counterparts, with Atlanta and Miami in the lead at 20 percent."

Feminist theory generally defines gender as a social construct that includes ideologies governing feminine/masculine (female/male) appearances, actions, and behaviors. An example of these gender roles would be that males were supposed to be the educated breadwinners of the family, and occupiers of the public sphere whereas, the female's duty was to be a homemaker, take care of her husband and children, and occupy the private sphere. According to contemporary gender role ideology, gender roles are continuously changing. This can be seen in Londa Schiebinger's Has Feminism Changed Science, in which she states, "Gendered characteristics – typically masculine or feminine behaviors, interests, or values-are not innate, nor are they arbitrary. They are formed by historical circumstances. They can also change with historical circumstances."

One example of the contemporary definition of gender was depicted in Sally Shuttleworth's Female Circulation in which the, "abasement of the woman, reducing her from an active participant in the labor market to the passive bodily existence to be controlled by male expertise is indicative of the ways in which the ideological deployment of gender roles operated to facilitate and sustain the changing structure of familial and market relations in Victorian England." In other words, this shows what it meant to grow up into the roles (gender roles) of a female in Victorian England, which transitioned from being a homemaker to being a working woman and then back to being passive and inferior to males. In conclusion, gender roles in the contemporary sex gender model are socially constructed, always changing, and do not really exist since they are ideologies that society constructs for various benefits at various times in history.

=== Men's rights ===
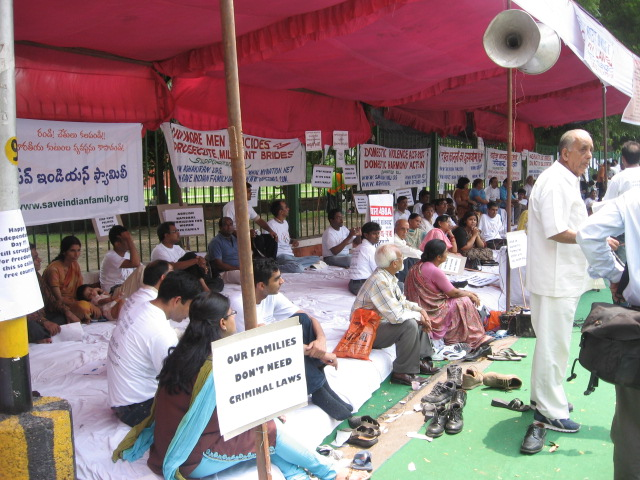
Protest in New Delhi for men's rights organized by the Save Indian Family Foundation

The men's rights movement (MRM) is a part of the larger men's movement. It branched off from the men's liberation movement in the early 1970s. The men's rights movement comprises a variety of groups and individuals concerned with what they consider issues of male disadvantage, discrimination, and oppression. The movement focuses on issues in numerous areas of society (including family law, parenting, reproduction, domestic violence) and government services (including education, compulsory military service, social safety nets, and health policies) that they believe discriminate against men.

Scholars consider the men's rights movement, or parts of it, to be a backlash against feminism. The men's rights movement denies that men are privileged relative to women. The movement is divided into two camps: those who consider men and women to be harmed equally by sexism, and those who view society as endorsing the degradation of men and upholding female privilege.

Men's rights groups have called for male-focused governmental structures to address issues specific to men and boys, including education, health, work, and marriage. Men's rights groups in India have called for the creation of a Men's Welfare Ministry and a National Commission for Men, as well as the abolition of the National Commission for Women. In the United Kingdom, the creation of a Minister for Men analogous to the existing Minister for Women, have been proposed by David Amess, MP and Lord Northbourne, but were rejected by the government of Tony Blair. In the United States, Warren Farrell heads a commission focused on the creation of a "White House Council on Boys and Men" as a counterpart to the "White House Council on Women and Girls" which was formed in March 2009.

Related to this is the Father's Rights Movement, whose members seek social and political reforms that affect fathers and their children. These individuals contest that societal institutions such as family courts, and laws relating to child custody and child support payments, are gender biased in favor of mothers as the default caregiver. They are therefore systemically discriminatory against males regardless of their actual caregiving ability, because males are typically seen as the bread-winner, and females as the caregiver.

=== Gender neutrality ===
Gender neutrality is the movement to end discrimination of gender altogether in society through means of gender neutral language, the end of sex segregation, and other means.

=== Transgender and cross-dressing ===
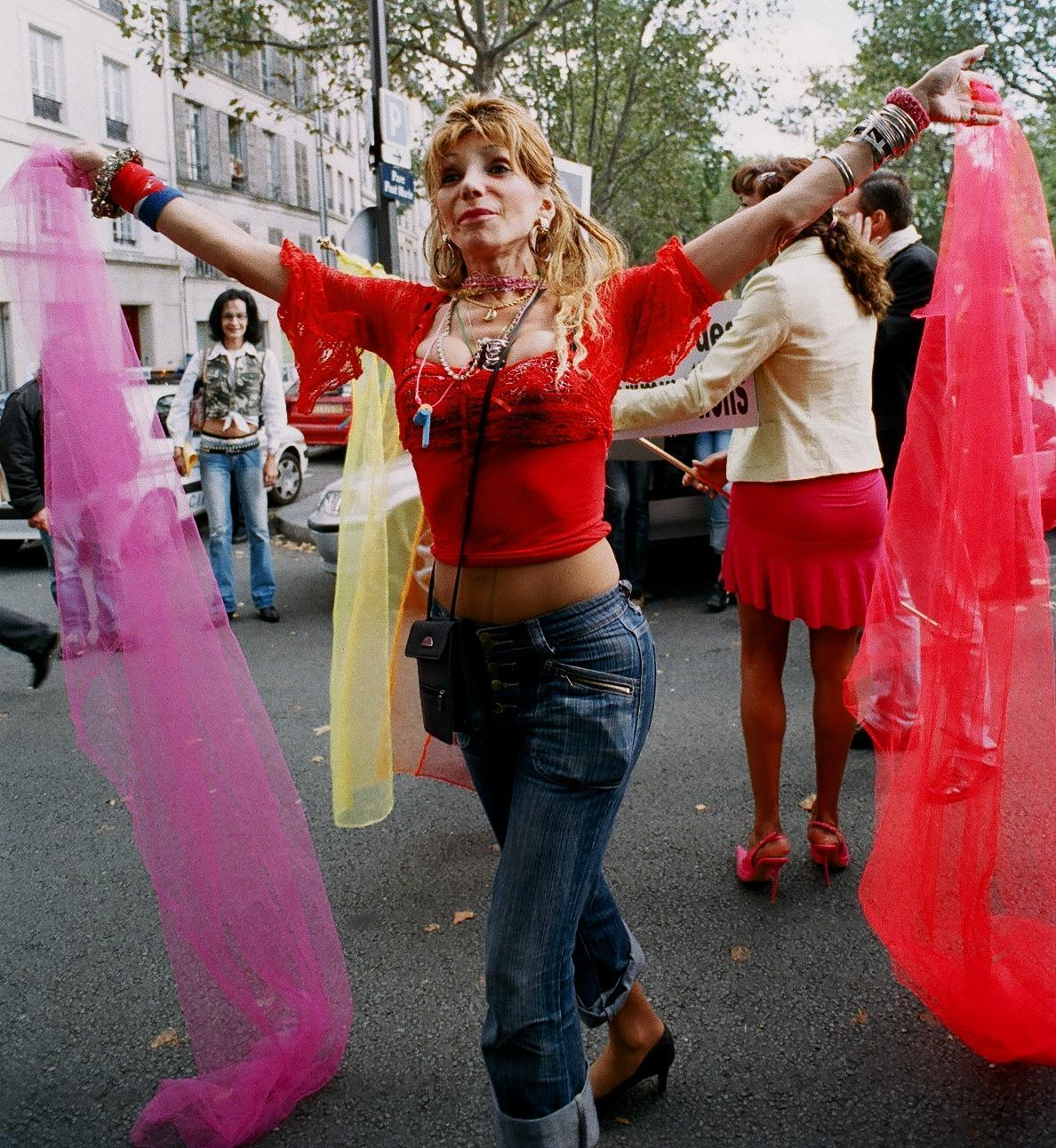
Camille Cabral, a transgender activist at a demonstration for transgender people in Paris, 1 October 2005

Transgender is the state of one's gender identity or gender expression not matching one's assigned sex. Transgender is independent of sexual orientation; transgender people may identify as heterosexual, homosexual, bisexual, etc.; some may consider conventional sexual orientation labels inadequate or inapplicable to them. The definition of transgender includes:

- "Denoting or relating to a person whose sense of personal identity and gender does not correspond with their birth sex."
- "People who were assigned a sex, usually at birth and based on their genitals, but who feel that this is a false or incomplete description of themselves."
- "Non-identification with, or non-presentation as, the sex (and assumed gender) one was assigned at birth."

While people self-identify as transgender, the transgender identity umbrella includes sometimes-overlapping categories. These include transsexual; cross-dresser; genderqueer; androgyne; and bigender. Usually not included are transvestic fetishists (because it is considered to be a paraphilia rather than gender identification), and drag kings and drag queens, who are performers who cross-dress for the purpose of entertaining. In an interview, celebrity drag queen RuPaul talked about society's ambivalence to the differences in the people who embody these terms. "A friend of mine recently did the Oprah show about transgender youth", said RuPaul. "It was obvious that we, as a culture, have a hard time trying to understand the difference between a drag queen, transsexual, and a transgender, yet we find it very easy to know the difference between the American baseball league and the National baseball league, when they are both so similar."

== By country ==
- Gender roles and fluidity in indigenous Nigerian cultures
- Gender roles among the Indigenous peoples of North America
- Gender roles in childhood
- Gender roles in post-communist Central and Eastern Europe
- Gender roles in pre-Columbian Mesoamerica
- Gender roles in Latial Culture

== See also ==
- Anti-gender movement
- Childhood gender nonconformity
- Dominatrix
- Gender bender
- Gender polarization
- Gender policing
- Gendered associations of pink and blue
- Locus of control#Gender-based differences
- Male expendability
- Misandry
- Misogyny
- Sex and gender distinction
- Sexual inversion (sexology)
- Women and children first
- Women-are-wonderful effect
