= Information manipulation theory =

Interpersonal communication theory dealing with deceptive messages

Information manipulation theory (IMT) is a theory of deceptive discourse production, rooted in H. Paul Grice's theory of conversational implicature. IMT argues that, rather than communicators producing truths and lies, the vast majority of everyday deceptive discourse involves complicated combinations of elements that fall somewhere in between these polar opposites; with the most common form of deception being the omission of contextually problematic information, commonly known as white lies. More specifically, individuals have four different ways of misleading others: playing with the amount of relevant information that is shared, including false information, presenting irrelevant information, and/or presenting information in a vague or ambiguous fashion. As long as such manipulations remain undetected by recipients, deception will succeed. Two of the most important practical implications of IMT are that deceivers commonly use messages composed entirely of truthful information to deceive; and that because this is the case, our ability to detect deception in real-world environments is extremely limited.

== History and central themes ==
In the fall of 1987 and early spring of 1988, deception scholar Steven McCornack - then a doctoral student at the University of Illinois - collected data for his dissertation. Somewhat unwittingly McCornack employed a method not used by prior deception researchers. At that time, most deception researchers instructed study participants to either "lie" or "tell the truth." McCornack, however, gave participants in his study no such guidance. Instead, he placed them in situations that had provoked other people to lie, and asked them what they would say (he previously had gathered data on the kinds of situations that trigger lying amongst college students). Fully expecting to be able to code his data in terms of "truth" versus "falsity," McCornack was stunned to observe that the messages that had been generated defied such a dichotomy. The typical message in his data involved complex combinations of truthful and false elements. In his subsequent dissertation, McCornack argued that deceivers manipulate two primary dimensions when seeking to mislead others: the amount of information that is shared, and whether or not such information is distorted.

Two years later, while an assistant professor at Michigan State University, McCornack revisited his dissertation data. Dissatisfied with his dissertation's two-dimensional characterization of messages (i.e., "amount of information" and "distortion of information"), he sought the counsel of his doctoral advisor, Barbara O'Keefe, who recommended that he draw upon Paul Grice's theory of conversational implicature as the theoretical foundation. Reanalyzing his data from a four-dimensional Gricean perspective (see below), McCornack found an almost perfect goodness-of-fit, and authored a series of conference papers explicating his analysis.

In 1992, McCornack published two articles that are recognized as the seminal works in information manipulation theory. In his first article, McCornack lays out the basic premise of IMT, namely that deception messages derive from covert violations of conversational maxims, and that “deceptive messages function deceptively because they violate the principles that govern conversational exchanges”. The second article, written in collaboration with noted deception scholar Timothy Levine provided an empirical test of the theory.

== Prior work on deceptive discourse forms ==
Prior to the publication of information manipulation theory, a handful of studies had examined the various ways people play with information when misleading others; although no collective theoretical framework had been posited connecting these works to one another. The most influential of these, in shaping McCornack's thinking, was a study by Turner, Edgley, and Olmstead examining information control during important conversations. Turner et al. had participants record an important conversation, and then self-analyze how many of their utterances were completely honest, versus those that controlled information in significant ways. They observed several forms of information control, and described them in terms of categories, including "lies", "exaggerations", "half-truths", "secrets", and "diversionary responses". They also observed that the vast majority (61.5%) of utterances in important conversations were not completely honest, but controlled information in some fashion.

Other scholars also had posited taxonomies of deception types. In 1984, Hopper and Bell introduced a typology of deceptive types using English terms, including "fictions", "playings", "lies", "crimes", "masks", and "unlies". In 1986, Metts and Chronis posited deception as something that arises when communicators are faced with complicated contexts involving multiple and competing goals. Metts and Chronis depicted variation in deceptive discourse as varying on a continuum of covert to overt misrepresentation of information.

== Theoretical foundation ==
As McCornack has frequently noted, "to understand IMT one must first understand Grice". That is, IMT is rooted in the theory of conversational implicature posited by Paul Grice. Grice was a 20th-century philosopher of pragmatics, who was especially interested in how people convey meaning beyond that which is encoded in the words themselves, using non-conventionalized implications. Grice noted that in conversations, speakers have knowledge that their utterances are rational contributions to conversational exchange. Grice framed this as a cooperative principle; namely, "make your conversational contribution such as is required, at the stage at which it occurs, by the accepted purpose or direction of the talk exchange in which you are engaged". As a consequence of this underlying presumption, listeners - when faced with utterances that appear to defy sense-making - can presume that in fact speakers mean such utterances to be dovetailed to the focal purpose of the exchange.

Grice considered four things to be "required" for conversational exchanges to be rational: speakers must share all relevant information ("Quantity"), must avoid false information ("Quality"), must make their information relevant ("Relation"), and must make their information clear and direct ("Manner"). Grice noted, in his discussion of ways in which speakers violate these presumptions, the possibility of covert violations. That is, in certain circumstances, speakers may surreptitiously violate these expectancies; and when they do, "they are liable to mislead". In authoring IMT, McCornack focused upon this single line of text from Grice regarding the potential for deceptiveness, and expanded it into an entire framework for describing deceptive discourse; arguing that deception constitutes a form of irrational and non-cooperative human exchange.

== Major experimental findings ==
Initial experiments conducted by McCornack and Levine regarding information manipulation theory confirmed that manipulations of information along the four dimensions posited by the theory do, indeed, result in greater perceptions of deceptiveness. They also observed that some violations were considered “more deceptive” than others; namely, violations of Quality.

Another significant experiment was performed to see if the results of McCornack's theory could be generalized outside of Western cultures. This was examined through the lens of the individualist vs. collectivist debate. These two cultural poles are regarded as the most overarching themes of cultural identity and perspective. With the U.S. regarded as being representative of the Individualist perspective, Hong Kong was chosen to represent the Collectivist perspective. The dimensions of quality and relevance were regarded as deceptive, but not the other dimensions. This experiment concluded that what is seen as 'truthful, what violations are acceptable, the motivation for those violations and what is understood to be a conversational maxim is dependent on cultural identity.

Another experiment performed by L. Zhou and S. Lutterbie followed the work of the aforementioned tests of IMT. This experiment concluded that the best way to apply the principles of IMT across cultures is to take a multi-directional, multi-prong approach. This subject of normative actions in conversation should be approached with a top-down and bottom-up approach.

== Criticisms of IMT ==
Two substantial criticisms have been levelled at IMT:

- In 1996, communication scholar C. Scott Jacobs and his colleagues argued that McCornack misrepresented Paul Grice's work in his application of Grice's theory to deception. Specifically, they noted that whereas IMT examined information manipulations related to Gricean maxims, it failed to address the creation of deceptive implicatures. This issue was addressed in a critical rejoinder.
- In 1997, McCornack himself criticized IMT, arguing that it really "isn't a theory". Over the last 20 years, in various public presentations, McCornack has noted that "although the original IMT provides a useful conceptual framework for describing deceptive discourse, it's not really a theory" (see McCornack, 2022). The fact that IMT does not constitute a theory compelled McCornack to author and publish IMT2 in 2014.

== IMT2 ==
In 2014, McCornack, along with colleague Kelly Morrison and several of their graduate students (including Jihyun Paik and Xun Zhu) published information manipulation theory 2. IMT2 is a comprehensive theory of deceptive discourse production, rooted in research from speech production, cognitive science, and artificial intelligence models of problem-solving. IMT2 consists of three propositional sets and a host of specific, testable, non-falsifiable propositions. The central claim of IMT2 is that "deceptive and truthful discourse both are output from a speech production system involving parallel-distributed processing, guided by efficiency, memory, and means-ends reasoning; and this production process involves a rapid-fire series of cognitive cycles (involving distinct modules united by a conscious workspace), and modification of incrementally-constructed discourse during the turn-at-talk in response to dynamic current-state/end-state discrepancies".

At the core of IMT2 are three propositional sets, addressing how people play with information so as to mislead others; the cognitive load that should be associated with different forms of information manipulation; and the role that intentionality plays in the production process. These propositional sets are rooted in three fundamental assumptions that stand in sharp contrast to prevailing models of deception:

1. Within contexts in which the truth is situationally problematic (i.e., contexts in which people will face significant personal, relational, and/or professional costs for sharing the truth), deceptive discourse production often will be more cognitively efficient than truth-telling (i.e., deception will evoke less cognitive load than truthtelling) - which is precisely why people will trend toward deceptiveness within such situations.
2. Deceptive discourse, like all discourse, is not produced as intact, unitary, discrete "messages;" but instead, is incrementally constructed during turns at talk. The result is that people rarely produce "lies" in conversation; but instead routinely integrate small bits of false information into otherwise truthful discourse streams while speaking.
3. Deceptive intent may arise and decay at any point in the discourse production process; but most certainly need not occur a priori (i.e., before discourse production begins).

These three presumptions can be translated into several simple takeaways with huge practical and theoretical significance, for both scholars and laypersons alike:

- Deception often is easier than truth-telling, which is why people do it.
- People rarely produce bald-faced lies, but commonly intersperse their truthful discourse with bits of falsehood.
- As a consequence of #2 (above), scholars should shift their empirical focus to the study of how people play with information elements within their turns, rather than examining entire "messages."
- The most common form of deceptive discourse is editing-out problematic information while speaking (i.e., Quantity violations).
- Because Quantity violations are virtually impossible to detect (unless someone is privy to the truthful information being deleted), deception detection within everyday conversations will be poor.
- People often begin speaking before any intent to deceive arises; and only opt to deceive when problematic information is activated within memory.
