= Truth-default theory =

Communication theory

Truth-default theory (TDT) is a communication theory which predicts and explains the use of veracity and deception detection in humans. It was developed upon the discovery of the veracity effect, whereby the proportion of truths versus lies presented in a judgement study on deception will drive accuracy rates. This theory gets its name from its central idea which is the truth-default state. This idea suggests that people presume others to be honest because they either do not think of deception as a possibility during communicating or because there is insufficient evidence that they are being deceived. Emotions, arousal, strategic self-presentation, and cognitive effort are nonverbal behaviors that one might find in deception detection. Ultimately this theory predicts that speakers and listeners will default to use the truth to achieve their communicative goals. However, if the truth presents a problem, then deception will surface as a viable option for goal attainment.

== Background ==
As an alternative view of deception and detection, truth-default theory was introduced by Timothy R. Levine. Levine is a Professor and Chair of Communication Studies at University of Oklahoma. While experimenting with deception detection, Levine found that, even in high suspicion situations, truth-bias still occurred. At first, truth-bias was thought of as flawed cognitive processing but later found to be functional and adaptive. After enough focus on truth-bias, truth-default theory began to take shape.

== Deception ==
Knowing that you are intentionally misleading a person when communicating with them is considered deception. Deception in most cases is looked at as a negative thing that often leads to feeling of betrayal and distrust. There are several different types of deception such as lies, equivocations, concealments, exaggerations, and understatements. There are many reasons why people choose to use deception. Based on interpersonal deception theory, people often use deception to avoid punishment, maintain relationships, and preserve self image.

=== Deception motives ===
Deception motives refer to the theory that the majority of individuals only lie when they deem it unavoidable. People communicate honestly or choose to deceive with the same intention to achieve one goal, and when the truth allows that goal to be reached, people will not lie. It is only when the truth serves as an obstacle to their goal that people choose to deceive instead of using honest communication. Also, when deceivers try to save their self image and want to avoid hurting the other person, they use falsification tactics. Males tend to view deception more acceptable than females, therefore they tend to deceive more. Another study shows that women are more likely to deceive to protect their partner's self image, while men are more likely to deceive to protect themselves. For example, if a women's partner were to get a new haircut that she did not like she is more prone to lie and say she likes it to protect their self-image. A man might tell others that they make more money than they actually do in order to raise their self-image. Being able to successfully detect deception does not come easily to most, and that is why so many people are just automatically truth-biased. Studies have shown that people who are successful at detecting deception either receive a confession by the deceiver or has some preexisting knowledge of the situation.

== Truth bias ==
Truth bias is people's inclination towards believing, to some degree, the communication of another person, regardless of whether or not that person is actually lying or being untruthful. It is human nature to believe communication is honest, which in turn makes humans highly vulnerable to deception. Consequently, a person's ability to detect deception is weakened, particularly when the source of deception is unfamiliar. As long as a person already has the perception that everything they are told is true, they are still considered to be truth-biased.

The term "truth bias" was first coined in 1984 by deception researcher Steven McCornack and his mentor Malcolm "Mac" Parks, while conducting an experiment that led to them to posit the McCornack-Parks Model of Deception Detection. On page 24 of Zuckerman, DePaulo, and Rosenthal's meta-analysis, the authors described having observed a "truthfulness bias" in which detectors under certain conditions were more likely to perceive truthfulness in sources. Parks and McCornack had observed the same pattern amongst dating partners, and so they shortened the name to "truth bias," and added it to their causal model. In subsequent works, McCornack and fellow deception scholar Timothy Levine broadened its inclusiveness to enfold a general tendency toward judging the communication of others as truthful. An example of truth bias is if a person were given a series of truths and lies, generally, the accuracy with which they detect truths would likely be above 50%, and the accuracy with which they detect lies would likely be below 50%. The results of deception research conducted by Timothy Levine illustrates that this is due in part to the "truth-lie base-rate," which is a part of the "Park-Levine Probability Model."

The theory states that there are two reasons an individual will assume the communication is honest:

1. Failure of the individual to "actively consider the possibility of deceit at all."
2. The default human state the individual goes to because they cannot find evidence of being lied to.

This is the central premise to the truth-default theory. Unless an individual finds active evidence to believe they are being deceived, the individual will take the communication as honest. This concept is also referred to as The Projective Motive Model, or the idea that individuals are less vulnerable to deception when they are already suspicious of the communication.

Individuals' detection of deception also relies on the person's ability to pick up on verbal and non-verbal cues. Generally, non-verbal communication is more difficult for an individual to disguise than untruthful statements. Nonverbal manipulation of one's truth bias depends on a person's physical presence and ability to "sell" untruthful communication.

=== The veracity effect ===
The veracity effect is the tendency for people's accuracy in judging truth to be significantly higher than it is for judging lies. Accuracy in communication can be based on whether the message is honest or not. Messages that are honest tend to have higher accuracy than messages that are not honest. If a message is true, there is a better chance an individual would be able to accurately detect that it is true and not a lie. According to Timothy Levine, veracity effect came from truth-bias in observers. Veracity (or honesty) is the truthfulness of a statement. Veracity can be influenced by weird behavior or norm violations. Behaviors that go against the social norm of truth telling such as teeth grinding, averting eye contact, and abnormally stretching, create the perception of deception. Tim Levine refers to these behaviors as creating a "negative halo effect". Other factors that may influence a person's accuracy of deception detection include the falsifiability and infrequency of reported events. Truth bias plays a role and is rooted in the veracity effect, as well as truth default, which goes hand in hand with its results.

As humans, we are not very accurate when detecting lies from the truth. It is thought that we are approximately only fifty to sixty percent capable of detecting deception. With these odds, we hardly have the upper hand on a game of chance at telling whether or not to trust what we are being told. There are several reasons behind why we are incapable of detecting deception, one of the most significant being the fact that not all people show the same tell tale signs when they are lying. It is commonly thought that avoiding eye contact, inability to sit still, nervousness in the voice, etc. are accurate ways to tell that someone is lying. However, someone who is being truthful might partake in these "suspicious" behaviors simply as part of their personal mannerisms. On the other hand, someone who is being deceitful may not show signs of deception at all, thus creating a gap in the capability of humans to detect deceptions.

=== The probing effect ===
The probing effect is when a person that is questioned gives minimal answers truthfully rather than answering accurately. The interviewer is more likely to believe the interviewee when they know he or she is being honest rather than providing an identical answer. Questioning of a source makes it more likely that they are believable, and this increases the receivers truth-bias. With research, they find that the increase in truth bias and not on the grounds of seeing the little to no impact on the accuracy of the questioning. Although the probing effect can be controversial when it comes to explaining just why it happens, researchers attempt to explain through the sender behavioral adaptation (the BAE, Behavioral Adaptation Explanation). BAE states that interviewees will adapt in order to appear as "honest." It was found that the probing effect was held when the senders behavior was controlled and the explanation was resided in receiver cognition.

=== Critiques ===
If the probability of predicting deception was truly 50%, then with repeated trials, the influences of both truth bias and the veracity effect would be negated and eventually the accuracy of detection would become an even 50%. There has been some academic research to support this idea, with truth bias decreasing over time while overall accuracy increased.

There are also different perspectives on how people make a decision of whether someone is lying or telling the truth. The Adaptive Lie Detector account (ALIED) argues that people do not default to believe information is true. Instead, people examine the clues that are available about the current statement being assessed (called 'individuating cues') and information that generalises across statements in this context (called 'context-general information'). When individuating cues are highly diagnostic (e.g., Pinocchio's nose is a perfect predictor of his deception), ALIED claims that people rely on this information heavily to make their decision, but when these individuating cues are unreliable (e.g., the speaker avoids eye contact, which is not a reliable clue to deception), information about statements in general weighs more heavily into forming the decision. Because people tend to tell the truth more often than they lie (e.g.,) and because individuating cues are typically not diagnostic, ALIED argues that this is why people are biased to believe others show the truth bias: it is not a default of honesty (as TDT would claim), but an adaptive and functional decision that reflects the best understanding one can obtain when the cues in the environment are not very diagnostic. ALIED is able to explain why in certain circumstances, such as when people are trained to spot lies or operate in environments where deception is common, people are biased to judge others as lying (a "lie bias", e.g.)

=== Sender honest demeanor ===
Sender demeanor refers to the believability in a message and how people will believe this idea. It has been stated to be the most influential source of variation in deception detection. Demeanor refers to the behavior displayed by one person to express desirable or undesirable qualities. When considering the demeanor of an approachable or well liked person, socialization or character training comes to mind for people who are defined as well-demeaned.

== Truth-default theory vs. Information manipulation theory ==
Truth Default Theory (TDT) is the analysis of human communication as it is received as an incoming message. This is not to be confused with Information Manipulation Theory (IMT) which analyzes the use of truth from the sender, seeking to understand how natural "truth telling" is. While TDT implies that humans have a truth bias when sending information, IMT addresses in detail the perspective of the sender. IMT declares that in order for humans to rely on defective communication it must be efficient otherwise honest communication is preferred by the sender. Therefore, IMT declares that truth telling is not the automatic/default form of communication despite our beliefs of human communication; furthermore declaring that lying may be a natural response if it warrants efficiency. Motivation might be explained why these two theories diverge both in theory and lines of research. The hypothesis that arose from these two theories is that lying may come naturally, or more naturally than truth telling. Lying might be an automatic response. Some of the reasons that lying might be an automatic response can be referenced to why people choose to use deception, for example maintaining a self image. When people are communicating they usually have a core belief that what the other person is saying is truthful. A lot of Supposed which supports TDT is data showing most people report to usually tell the truth and the tendency for people to believe that communication is usually more truthful than deceptive. IMT has more to do with humans wanting to maximize efficiency in communication.

=== Cognitive psychology ===
Researchers have looked into individuals’ cognitive effort when choosing between a lie or the truth. Lying has been proven to be more difficult for the brain to process than telling the truth, they have found that lying increases activity in various brain regions. It takes the brain longer to formulate a deceptive answer than it does a truthful answer when a person is asked to answer questions at a faster speed. Overall, the truth is the first thing that comes to mind for a person in most situations. A humans mind is flexible enough to adapt in certain situations when needing to be deceptive, there are just certain variable and time restraints that arise from it.

=== Social psychology ===
Social Psychology has explored whether the tendency to tell the truth prevails. When a lie serves a person's self-interest they might be more prone to lying because it ends in a positive result for them. As noted before, self-interest has been found to be the driving force for people to practice deception. People are most prone to lie after engaging in a depleting task, when they are sleep deprived, and later in the day compared to when they first wake up.

=== The power of motivation ===
Both IMC2 and TDT have shown that motivation could be the driving force between people's responses to either lie or tell the truth. Whether it is being entrusted to lie or given the opportunity to lie, most findings show is a trend in how the lie serves self-interest. TDT has shown that lying is a default option if it in some way serves in self-interest of a person. IMC2 supports that one is consistent with lying when they have something to gain or not lose from lying or telling the truth.

== Modules ==
Truth-Default Theory (TDT) Propositions

Timothy R. Levine, a Communication studies scholar at the University of Alabama at Birmingham states that several effects, models, and mini-theories comprise the truth-default theory. The logical structure can be reflected in 12 different propositions and contains 13 modules, effects, and mini-theories. Each of these modules are independent ideas which contribute to the truth-default theory as a whole. These are the Few Prolific Liars Model, the Deception Motives Module, the Projected Motive Model, the Veracity Effect, the Park–Levine Probability Model, the A Few Transparent Liars, the Sender Honest Demeanor module, and the How People Really Detect Lies module.
