= Lexical entrainment =

When people agree on terminology in a given conversation

In conversational linguistics, lexical entrainment is the phenomenon by which a speaker adopts the referential terms used by their interlocutor. It acts as a mechanism of the cooperative principle in which both parties to the conversation employ lexical entrainment as a progressive system to develop "conceptual pacts" (a working temporary conversational terminology) to ensure maximum clarity of reference in the communication between the parties; this process is necessary to overcome the ambiguity inherent in the multitude of synonyms that exist in language.

Lexical entrainment arises by two cooperative mechanisms:

- Embedded corrections – a reference to the object implied by the context of the sentence, but with no explicit reference to the change in terminology
- Exposed corrections – an explicit reference to the change in terminology, possibly including a request to assign the referent a common term (e.g., "by 'girl', do you mean 'Jane'?")

== Violation of Grice's maxim of quantity ==
Once lexical entrainment has come to determine the phrasing for a referent, both parties will use that terminology for the referent for a duration, even if it proceeds to violate the Gricean maxim of quantity. An important factor is lexical availability; the ease of conceptualizing a referent in a certain way and then retrieving and producing a label for it. For many objects, the most available labels are basic nouns; for example, the word "dog". Instead of saying animal or husky for the referent, most subjects will default to dog. If in a set of objects one is to refer to either a husky, a table, and a poster, people are still most likely to use the word "dog." This is technically a violation of Grice's maxim of quantity, as using the term animal is sufficient.

== Applications ==
Lexical entrainment has applications in natural language processing in computers, as well as human–human interaction. Until recently, the adaptability of computers to modify their referencing to the terms of their human interlocutor has been limited, so the entrainment adaptation always relied on the human operator. However, the emergence of Large Language Models (LLMs) may change this drastically. There is now evidence emerging that LLMs such as GPT-4 demonstrate alignment capabilities similar to that of humans.
