= W. F. Metts =

American football coach (1905–1993)

Biographical details
- Born: August 13, 1905
- Died: April 1, 1993 (aged 87)

Coaching career (HC unless noted)
- 1934–1937: Apprentice

Head coaching record
- Overall: 17–14–4

William Franklin Metts (August 13, 1905 – April 1, 1993) was an American football coach. He was the ninth head football coach at The Apprentice School in Newport News, Virginia and he held that position for four seasons, from 1934 until 1937. His coaching record at Apprentice was 17–14–4.
