= C. Scott Jacobs =

American academic

- Born: Curtis Scott Jacobs
- Education: University of Illinois
- Occupations: Argumentation, communication, and rhetorical scholar

Curtis Scott Jacobs, (Scott Jacobs), is an American argumentation, communication, and rhetorical scholar.

He graduated from the University of Illinois with a PhD. He taught for many years at the University of Arizona. He is now professor of Communication at the University of Illinois. He has lectured in France, Belgium, Germany, Italy, and the Netherlands. He has contributed to the field of argumentation theory.

His work appeared in Communication Monographs, Communication Theory, Journal of the American Forensic Association, Quarterly Journal of Speech, and Argumentation.

== Works ==
- Sally Jackson and Scott Jacobs (1992). "Structure of Conversational Argument: Pragmatic Bases for the Enthymeme". In William L. Benoit; Dale Hample; Pamela J. Benoit (eds.). Readings in argumentation. Walter de Gruyter. ISBN 978-3110135763. (appeared in The Quarterly Journal of Speech. LXVI, 251–265.)
- Karen Tracy (1991). "Digressions in Argumentative Discourse". In Karen Tracy (ed.). Understanding face-to-face interaction: issues linking goals and discourse. Routledge. ISBN 978-0805809077.
- Mark L. Knapp; John Augustine Daly, eds. (2002). "Language and Interpersonal Communication". Handbook of interpersonal communication. Sage. ISBN 978-0761921608.
- F. H. van Eemeren; J. Anthony Blair; Charles A. Willard, eds. (2003). "Two Conceptions of Openness in Argumentation Theory". Anyone who has a view: theoretical contributions to the study of argumentation. Springer. ISBN 978-1402014550.
