= Timothy R. Levine =

American academic

Timothy R. Levine is an American communication professor, prolific researcher, and theorist. He is Distinguished Professor and Chair of Communication Studies at The University of Oklahoma. Levine is credited as one of the most central and prolific researchers in the field of Communication Studies, is known for his work as the creator of truth-default theory, his developmental work on the veracity effect, and editing of the encyclopedia of deception. He is the author of Duped, published by The University of Alabama Press.

== Education ==
Levine was born in Scottsdale, Arizona and attended Northern Arizona University, where he received a BS in psychology, and West Virginia University, where he received a MA in communication in 1985. He earned a Ph.D. at Michigan State University in 1992.

== Career ==
Dr. Timothy Levine teaches and produces research on topics such as deception, interpersonal communication, persuasion, social influence, cross-cultural communication, and social scientific research methods. Levine teaches graduate and undergraduate classes, and also does training for police, attorneys, and people in the intelligence and counterintelligence work industry. Before he held his current position at UAB, Levine has had teaching positions at Korea University, Michigan State University, Indiana University and University of Hawaii. Some of his contributions to the study of communication are developments of Information Manipulation Theory, Truth Default Theory, the Veracity Effect, the Probing Effect, and the Park-Levine Probability Model. Levine has had research funded by the National Science Foundation, U.S. Department of Defense, and the FBI.
