= Sandra Metts =

- Occupation(s): Professor Emeritus, Author

Sandra M. Metts is an American interpersonal communication scholar who is Professor Emeritus in the School of Communication at Illinois State University.

Metts' career has focused on the study of interpersonal and social communication. Her research areas include deception in close relationships, politeness, sexual communication, relationship engagement, and facework—face is a social identity that people construct during social interactions. Metts has published numerous articles, edited several journals in her field, and co-authored multiple books.

In an interview, she says that her research aims “to contribute to our growing knowledge of what makes relationships succeed or fail. Since we all have friendships, romances, and family ties, the relevance of my work is broad and, I hope, useful.” In addition, Metts states all her responsibilities as a teacher are of importance, even the tasks that she may grumble through such as grading exams or putting together effective course packets. She finds her work as a teacher very rewarding. “I guess the most meaningful to me is providing students with the opportunity to have better lives, personally and professionally, to be in control of their communication rather than a victim of it, and to be able to appreciate and facilitate the communication efforts of other people.”

== Education ==
Metts completed both of her Bachelor of Arts degrees (in English Education and Sociology) from Western Washington University. She has a total of three master's degrees: one in American Literature from the University of Washington, another in Art History from Bowling Green University and a third in Performance Studies from the University of Northern Iowa. She earned her Ph.D. in Communication Research from the University of Iowa. In 1983 Metts joined the faculty at Illinois State University, where she remained until her retirement in 2014. Metts still teaches courses in interpersonal communication as an emerita professor.

== Awards and honors ==
In 2013, Metts was inducted into the Central States Communication Association's (CSCA) Hall of Fame for her commitment to scholarship, mentoring, and service in the field of Communication. In 2013, Metts was also awarded the CSCA Outstanding Mentor Award for her commitment to mentoring students and faculty in the discipline.

Metts served as the CSCA Vice President from 1997-1998 and president from 1998-1999. In 1997, she received the College of Arts and Sciences Lecturer Award.

== Publications ==
- Self-Disclosure by Valerian Derlega, Sandra M. Metts, Sandra Petronio and Stephen T. Margulis (1993)
- Facework by William R. Cupach and Sandra M. Metts (1994)
- Readings in Language & Communication: Interpersonal and Small Group Contexts by Elizabeth R. Lamoureux and Sandra Mae Metts (1996)
- Sexual Communication (An entry from Macmillan Reference USA's International Encyclopedia of Marriage and Family) by Sandra Metts and James Jaccard (2003)
- An Interview with Gerald Miller (An article from: Communication Studies) by Sandra Metts (2005)

== Published research ==
- Bowers, J. W., Metts, S. M., & Duncanson, W. T. (1985). Emotion and interpersonal communication. Handbook of interpersonal communication, 500-550.
- Metts, S. M. (1986). A Rules Analysis of Conversational Narratives. University Microfilms.
