= Pink and Blue =

Pink and blue or Pink & Blue may refer to:

- "Pink and Blue" (song), a 2013 song by Hannah Diamond
- Pink and Blue (Renoir), an 1881 painting of two girls
- Pink and Blue: Telling the Boys from the Girls in America, a 2012 book
- Pink and blue ribbon, a symbol worn to promote awareness of various causes
- Pink & Blue, a 2008 album by Waterdeep
- "Pink & Blue", a song by Outkast from the 2003 album Speakerboxxx/The Love Below
- "Pink & Blue", a song by Tycho from the 2019 album Weather (Tycho album)

== See also ==
- Gendered associations of pink and blue, how pink and blue became associated with girls and boys
- List of historical sources for pink and blue as gender signifiers, a list page of references in timeline form
- "Pink Turns to Blue", a song by American rock band Hüsker Dü
- Blue and Not So Pink, a 2012 Venezuelan film
- Pink and Blue for Two, a charitable health awareness organization
- Pink (disambiguation)
- Blue (disambiguation)
