= Gendered associations of pink and blue =

Cultural attribution of colors to genders

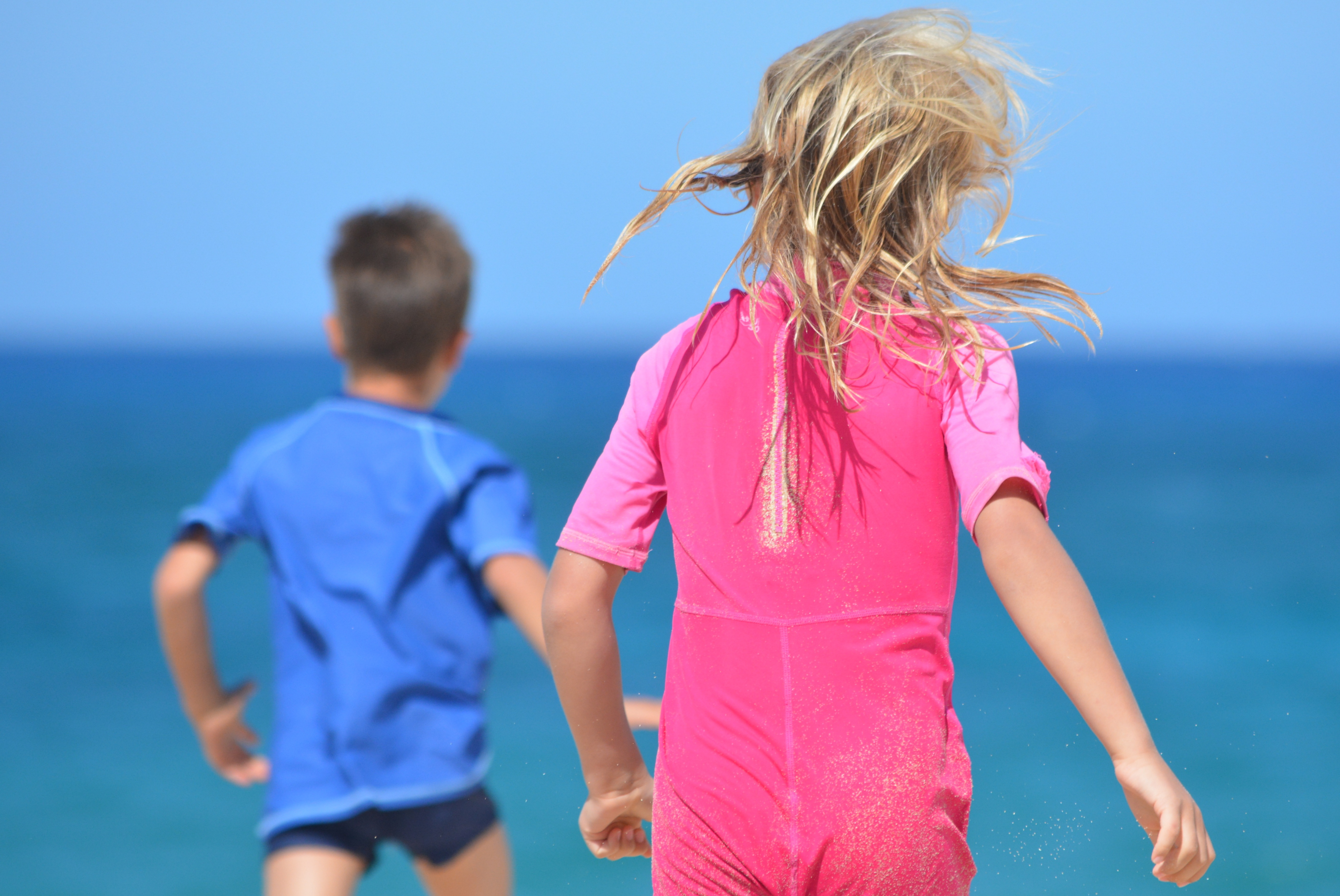
Children in blue and pink clothing

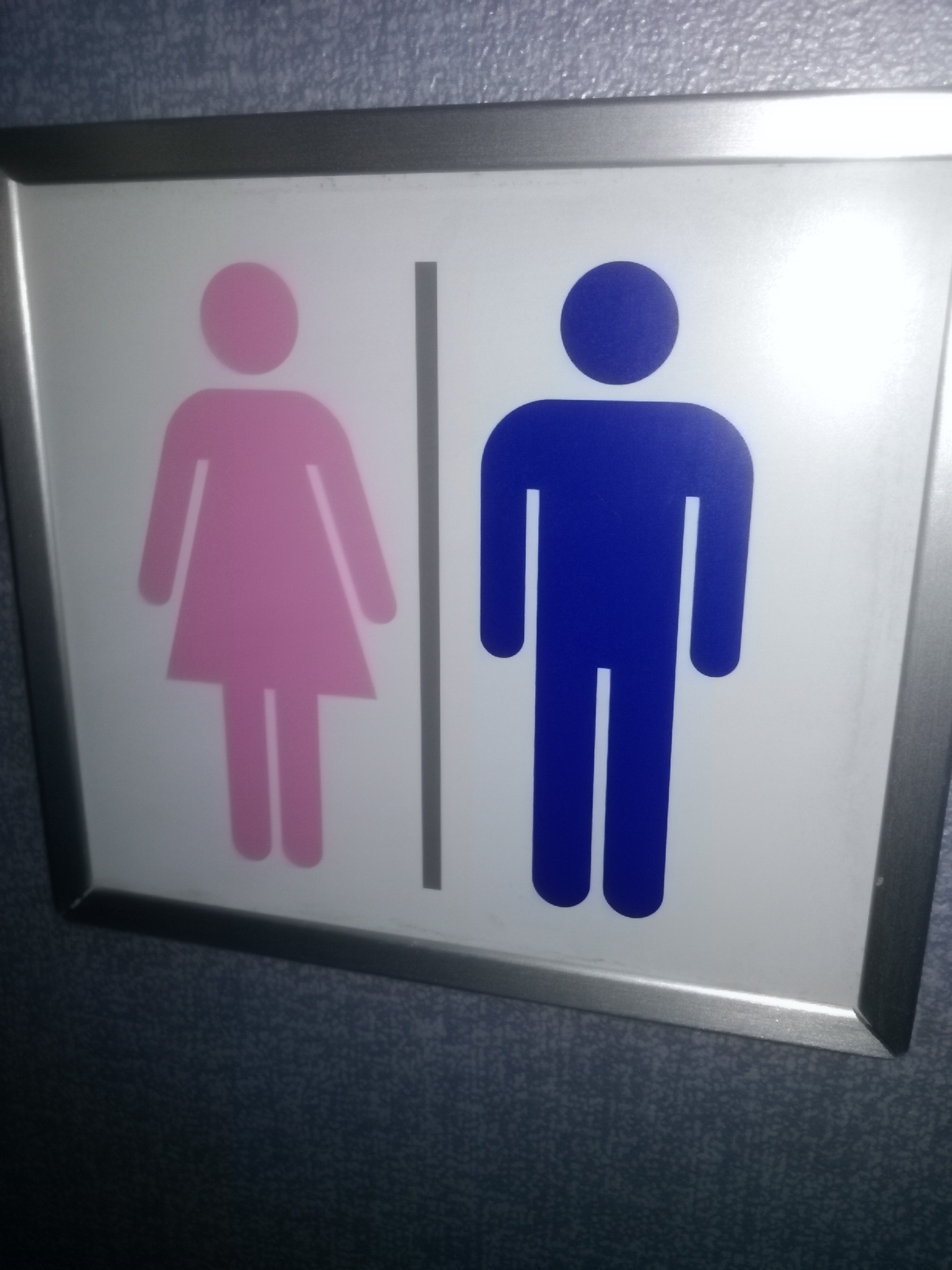
This restroom sign on an All Nippon Airways Boeing 767-300 uses pink for the female gender and blue for the male gender.

The colors pink and blue are associated with girls and boys respectively in large parts of the world.

Originating as a trend in the mid-19th century and applying primarily to clothing, gendered associations with pink and blue became more widespread from the 1950s onward. Since the 1990s, these gendered associations have also increasingly applied to toys as well, especially in the case of pink toys for girls. Additionally, the two colors are often used at gender reveal parties.

Various academic and popular sources have reported either a "pink–blue reversal", wherein the gendered associations of both colors were "flipped" sometime during the 20th century, or at least an inconsistency in the gendered application of colors prior to the mid-twentieth century, with several publications from the late 1800s to the early 1900s asserting pink being preferred for boys and blue for girls.

== History ==
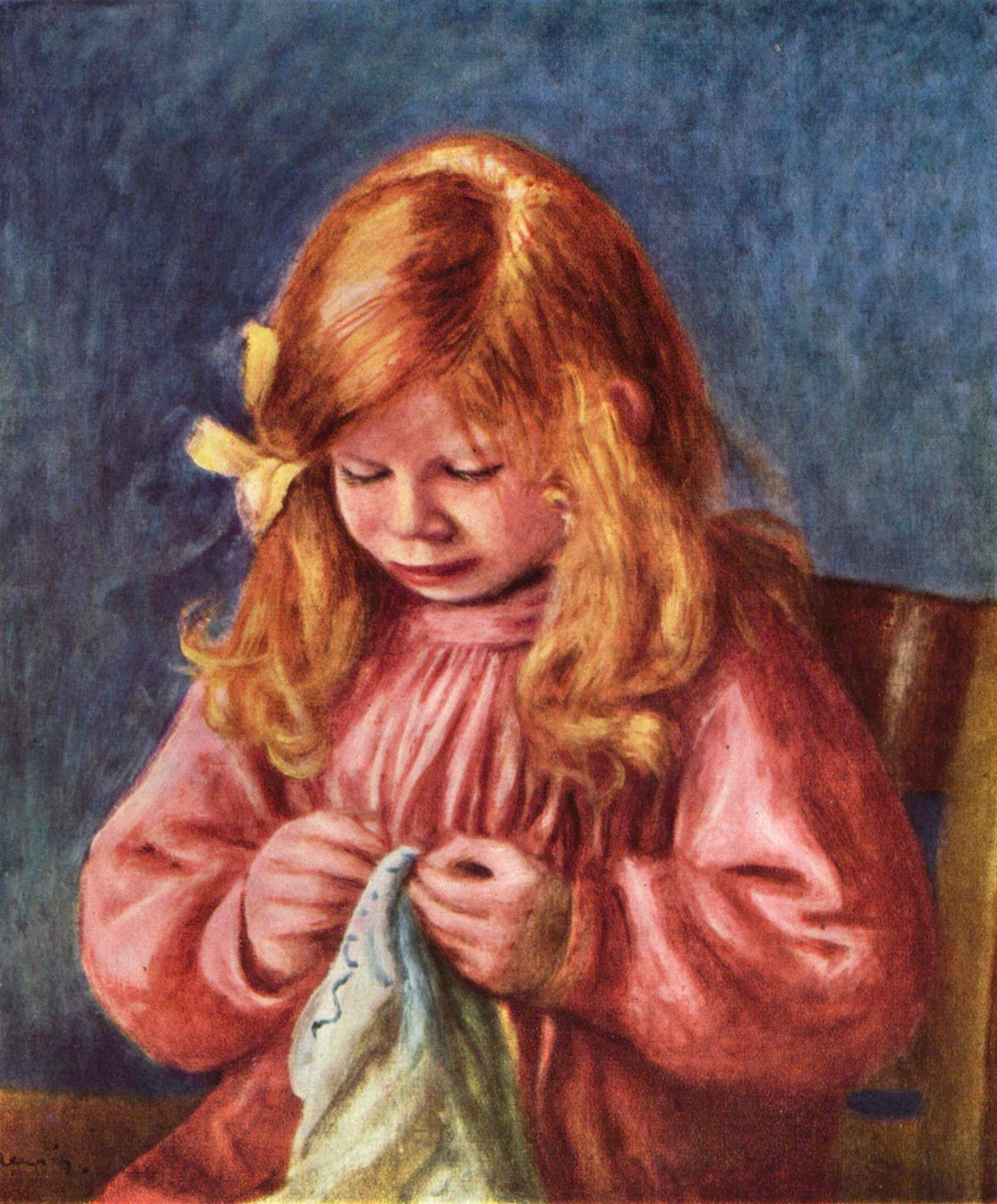
Pierre-Auguste Renoir's son Jean sewing (1900)

According to Jo Paoletti, who spent two decades studying the history of pink and blue gender-coding, there were no particular color associations for girls and boys at the turn of the 20th century. There was no agreement among manufacturers about which colors were feminine or masculine, or whether there were any such colors at all.

=== First half of the 20th century ===
Children's clothing began to be differentiated by gender in matters of cut, pockets, images, and decoration, but not by color. During the period 1900–1930, the fashions of young boys began to change in style, but not color. Pink and blue were used together as "baby colors". Birth announcements and baby books used both colors well into the 1950s, and then gradually became accepted as feminine and masculine colors. Styles and colors formerly considered neutral, including flowers, dainty trim, and the color pink, became more associated with only girls and women. Paoletti summarized the evolution of pink and blue associations with girls and boys: "It is clear that pink-blue gender coding was known in the late 1860s but was not dominant until the 1950s in most parts of the United States and not universal until a generation later."

In 1927, a chart published in Time magazine summarized the recommended hues at major department stores in the United States: six said pink for boys and blue for girls; four said the opposite.

=== Second half of the 20th century ===
A number of personalities and cultural icons of the 1950s and early 1960s had a great influence on the public awareness and use of pink in fashion and decoration, including Mamie Eisenhower, Marilyn Monroe, and Brigitte Bardot.

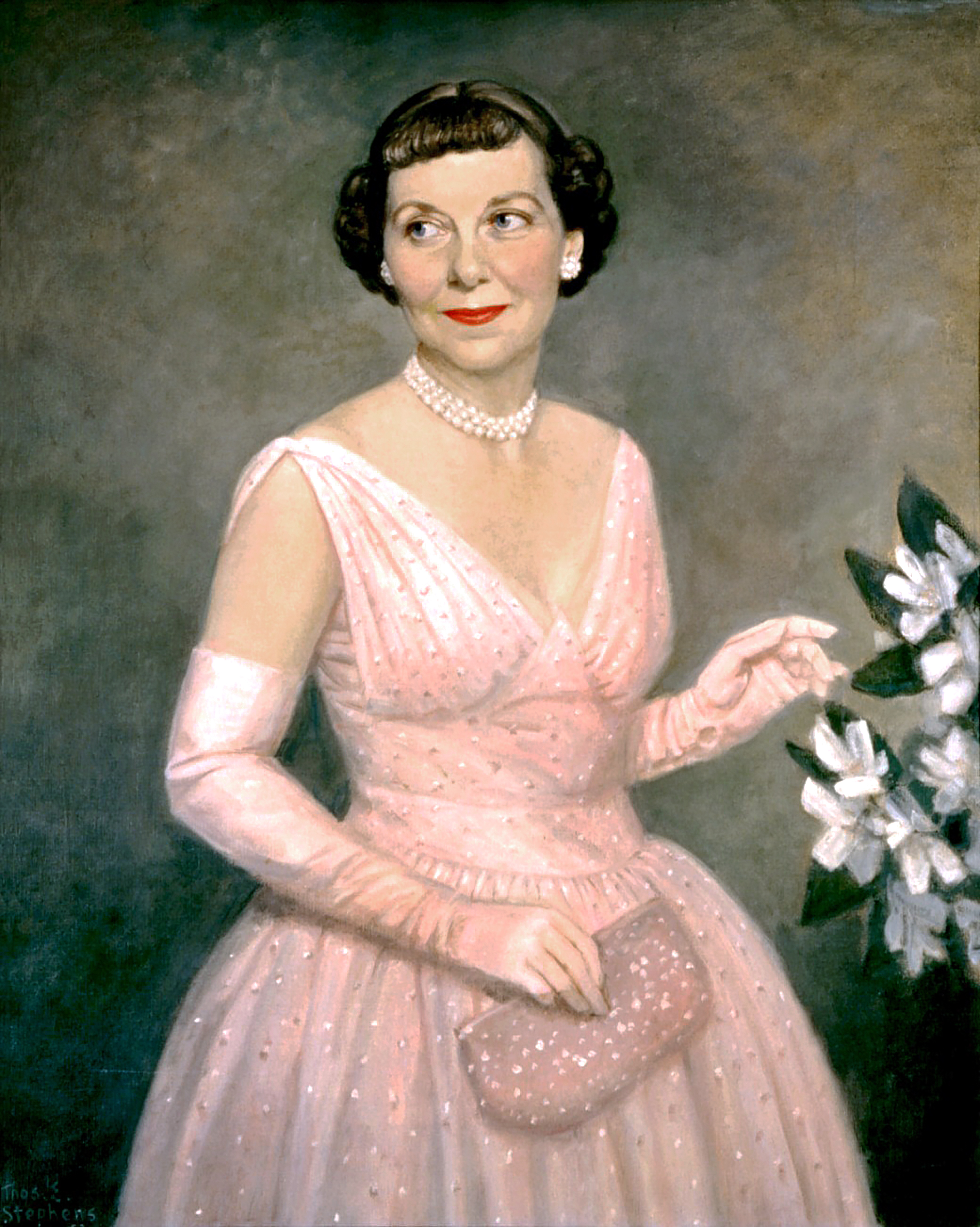
Mamie Eisenhower, in her White House portrait

Mamie Eisenhower was influential in the growing shift among women in the United States, and to some extent abroad, towards the association between pink and women's fashion and decorating. Mrs. Eisenhower was well known for preferring pink both in clothing and home decoration well before she became first lady, and more so after 1952 with the election of her husband Dwight D. Eisenhower as President of the United States. So much so, that a particular shade, known as "Mamie Pink" was named after her. When she took up residence in the White House in January 1953 she brought her favorite color with her, wearing a pink gown covered in pink rhinestones to the inaugural balls, and redecorating the White House in pink, to such an extent that it became known among the press corps as "The Pink Palace". Her tastes were picked up by the American public, and "Mamie Pink" became an iconic color in decorating in the 1950s, being used in bathroom fixtures, tiles, kitchen appliances, and more.

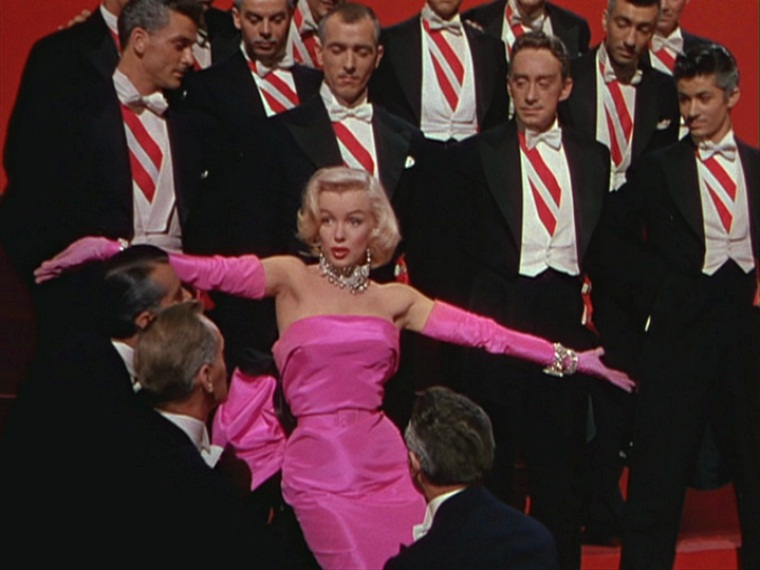
Monroe performing the song "Diamonds Are a Girl's Best Friend" in Gentlemen Prefer Blondes (1953) wearing a pink dress

Marilyn Monroe was already famous as a sex symbol in the early 1950s when the film Gentlemen Prefer Blondes came out. The musical comedy featured Monroe in the most famous musical number in the film, Diamonds Are a Girl's Best Friend, in a now iconic floor length, skin-tight silk dress; Monroe's dress was in shocking pink with a big bow on the back and matching shoulder length gloves. Monroe defined femininity and seduction, and her influence never ended.

Brigitte Bardot wore checkered pink gingham as her wedding dress for her wedding in 1959. This was formerly a material used only for curtains and created a sensation, and was widely copied and influential.

== Colored items ==
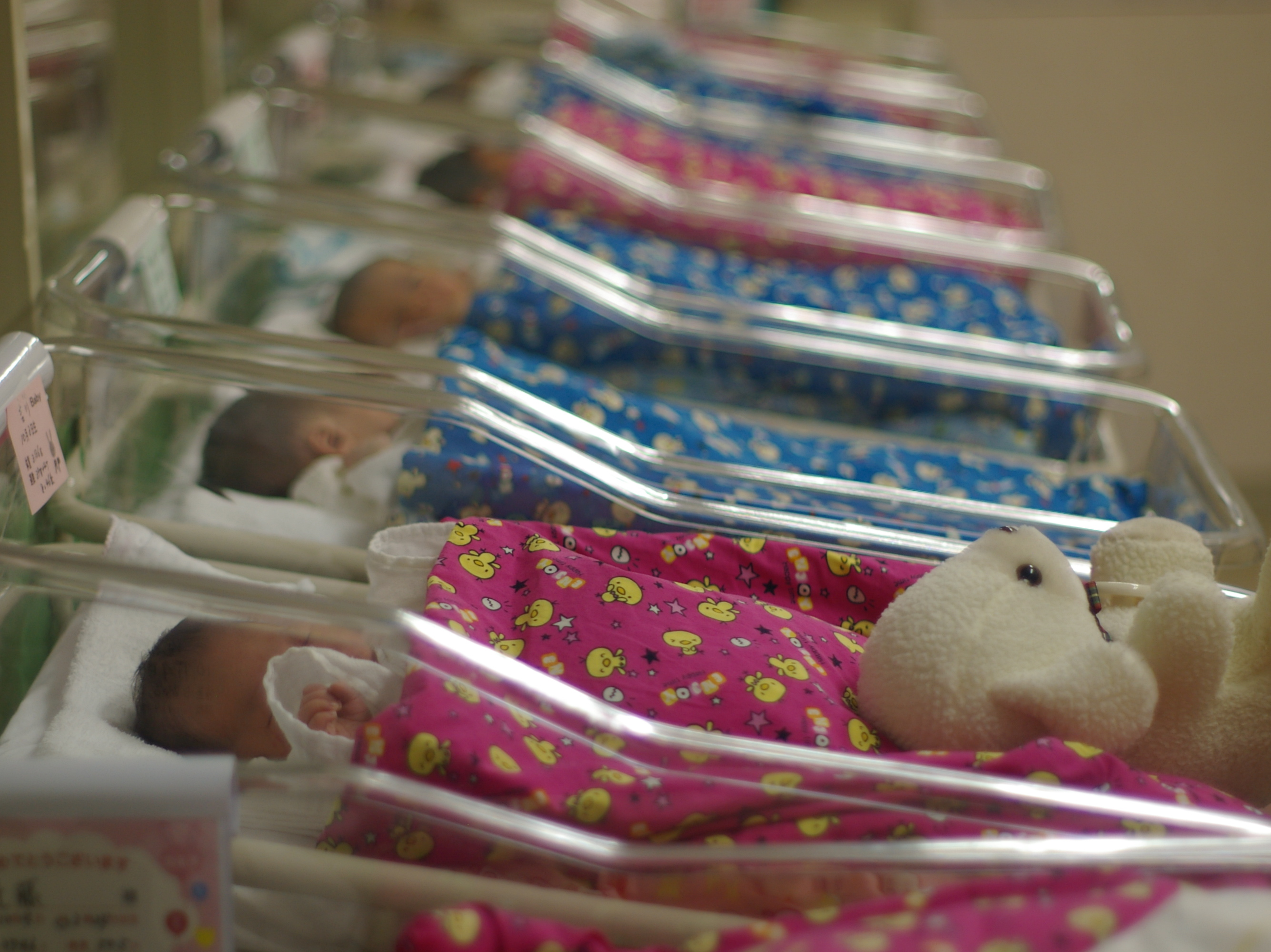
A hospital in Shiga, Japan, wraps newborn girls in pink blankets and boys in blue (2008).

=== Clothing ===
For infant and children's clothing, ribbons, and other items, the pink for girls, blue for boys associations known in European countries included: the Netherlands (1823), France (1834), Russia (1842), England (1862), and Spain (1896); and in the Americas: in the United States, and Mexico (1899).

A contrarian tendency to avoid gendered clothing colors for children and towards more unisex clothing in the United States began in the late 1960s, influenced by the Baby Boomer generation reaching child-bearing age, and the effects of second-wave feminism.

=== Pink Shirt Day ===
Pink Shirt Day is an annual event against bullying, held in Canada and New Zealand. Participants wear pink shirts and attend or host informative events to raise awareness about bullying, particularly in schools. Pink Shirt Day was started in 2007 in Canada, where it is held on the last Wednesday of February each year. It was adopted in New Zealand in 2009 and is observed annually on the third Friday of May.

=== International Day of Pink ===
The International Day of Pink is a worldwide anti-bullying and anti-homophobia event held annually during the second week of April. Though similar to Pink Shirt Day in that it also seeks to end all bullying, the Day of Pink is more specifically aimed towards anti-LGBTQ+ bullying.

=== Toys ===
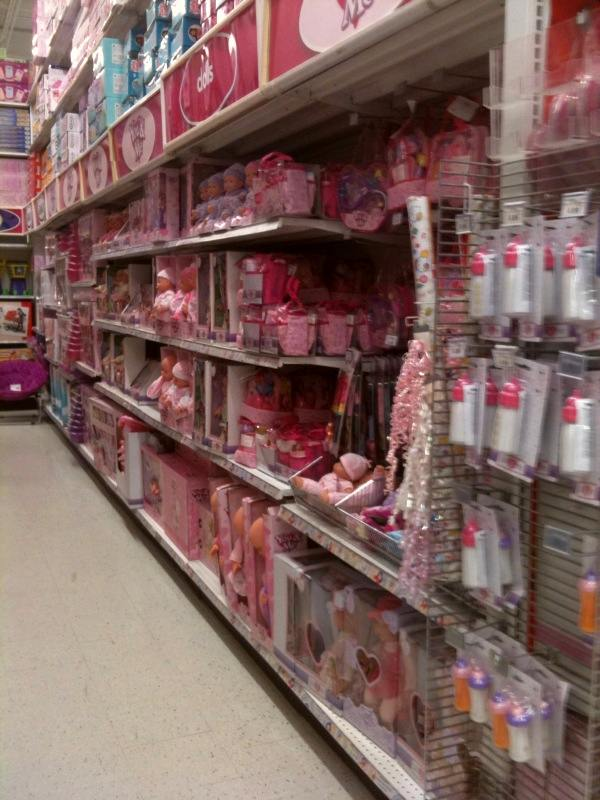
Shelves with pink-colored girls' toys, in a Canadian store

In the United States, girlie-girl culture developed in the 1990s in the wake of a series of successful Disney animated films, known as the Disney Renaissance, starting with The Little Mermaid (1989). These animated films were heavily marketed to girls especially, and pink was everywhere in marketing campaigns as they took advantage of what appeared to be a strong association between gender and certain colors: bold colors for boys, pastel colors for girls, especially pink. Eighty-six percent of pink toys were marketed as "girls only", and a similar percentage that were bold red, black, brown, or gray were for "boys only". Pink became a strong signal to girls and their parents about which products were being marketed to them.

=== Awareness ribbons ===
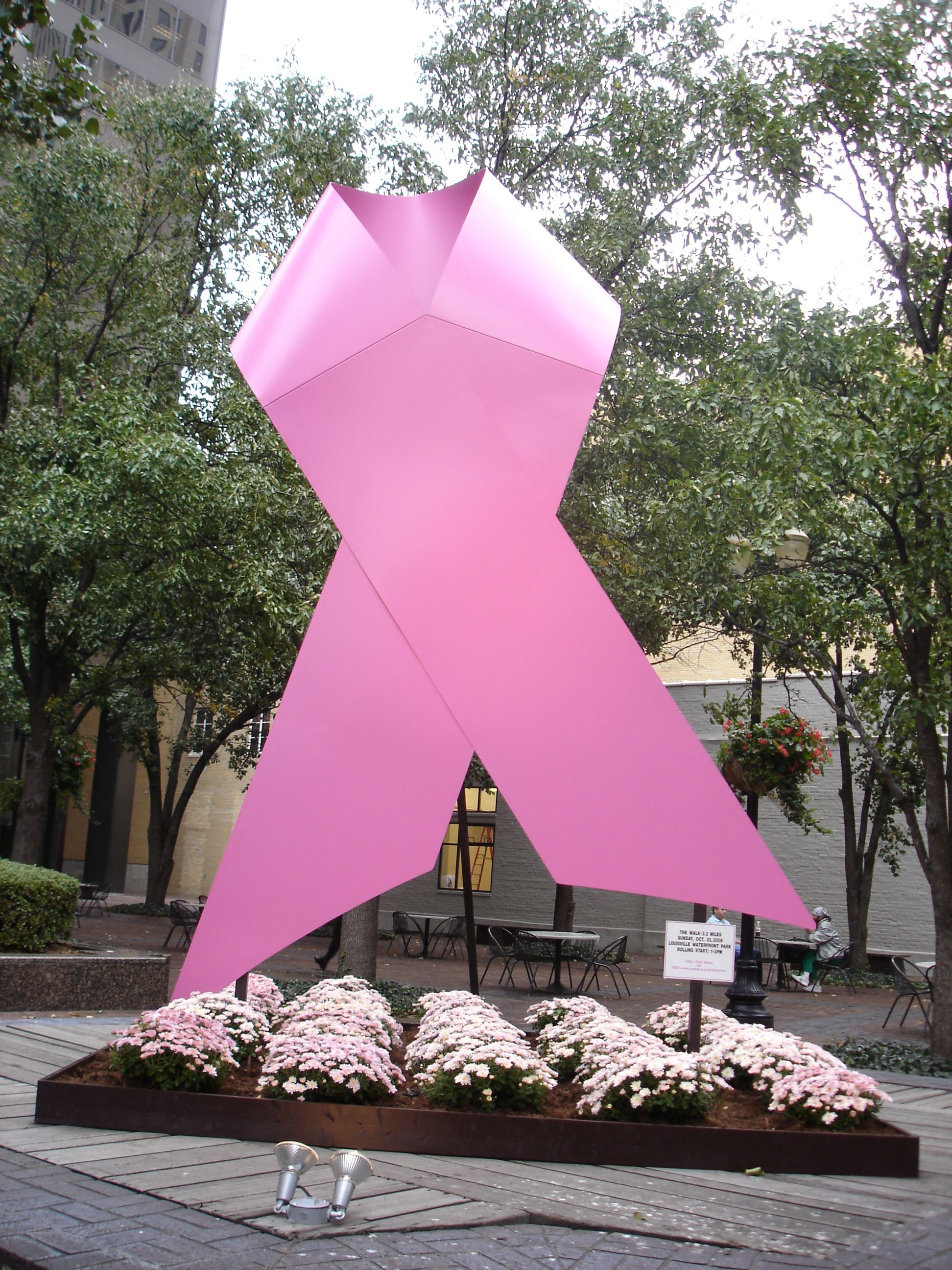
Breast Cancer Awareness, Louisville, Kentucky

A pink awareness ribbon is used as a symbol for breast cancer awareness, and are commonly seen in October during Breast Cancer Awareness Month. The color pink was chosen for the ribbon in 1992, as a symbol of breast cancer awareness.

Breast cancer organizations use the pink ribbon to associate themselves with breast cancer, to promote breast cancer awareness, and to support fundraising. Pink evokes traditional feminine gender roles, caring for other people, being beautiful, being good, and being cooperative. Some breast cancer-related organizations, such as Pink Ribbon International use the pink ribbon as their primary symbol. Susan G. Komen for the Cure uses a stylized "running ribbon" as their logo.

=== Gender reveal accessories ===
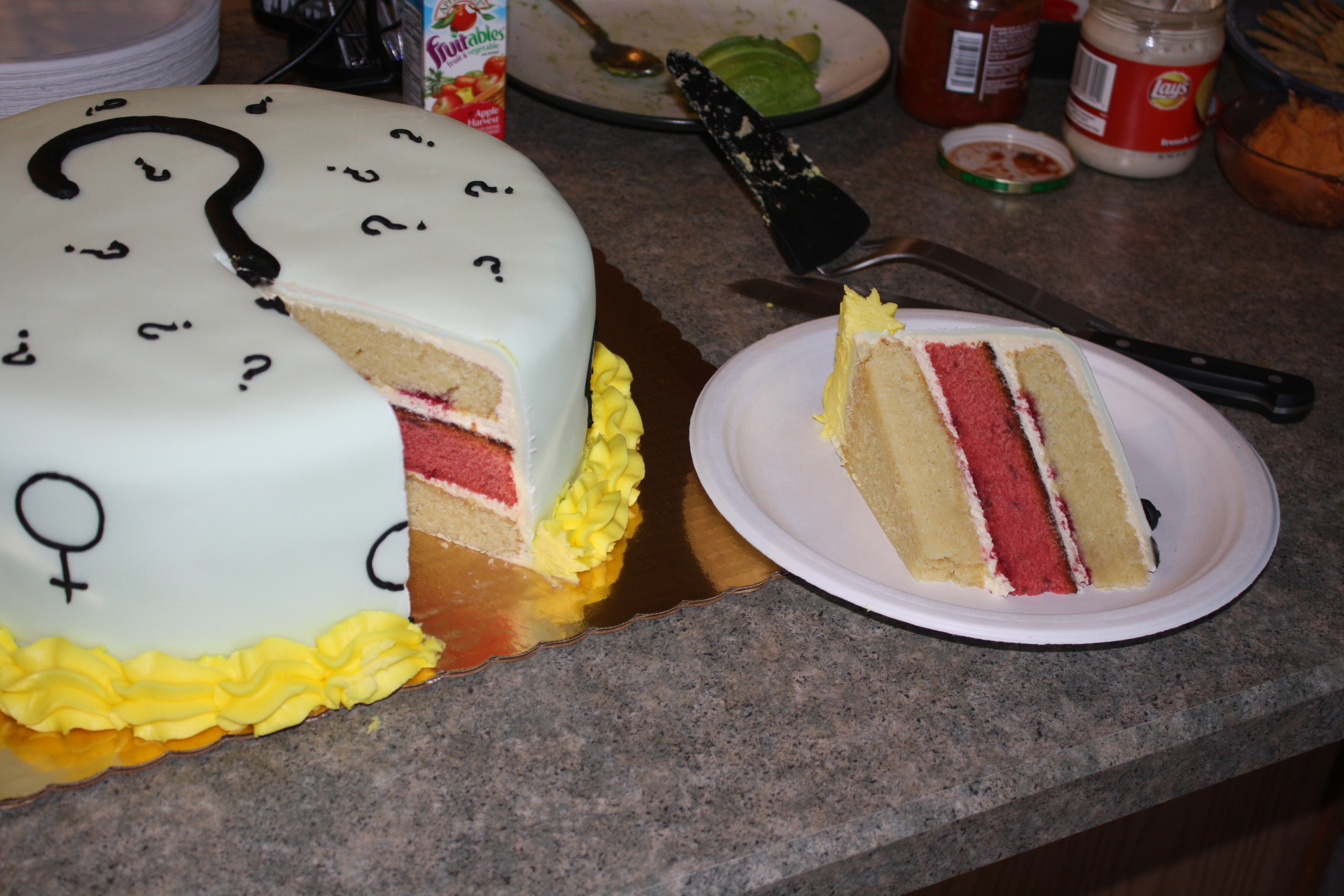
A cake with a pink middle layer indicating a baby girl

Gender reveal parties use props or accessories of various kinds to reveal to invited guests the sex of a baby before it is born. Props include cakes, balloons, confetti, smoke, fireworks, and other accessories to indicate whether the fetus is male or female, normally by means of a colored signal that is pink or blue. For example: a cake may be brought out, frosted in white or other neutrally-colored icing, which when cut, reveals a pinkish or blueish filling inside, thus indicating that the baby is expected to be a girl (pink) or a boy (blue).

=== Transgender flag ===
The transgender flag features pink and blue.

The transgender pride flag features five horizontal stripes: light blue stripes on the top and bottom, light pink stripes in second and fourth positions, and a white stripe in the center. The flag's designer, Monica Helms, describes the traditional associations of pink and blue as the reasons for the flag's colors. The blue stripes represent boys and men, the pink stripes represent girls and women, and the white stripe represents intersex, nonbinary, and gender-nonconforming people, and those still in transition.

=== Other ===
Even items that would seem to have no association with one gender or another, such as vitamin pills, have been produced in pink and blue and marketed towards girls and boys. Bic drew criticism in 2012 for its pink and purple "Bic Cristal for Her" ballpoint pens. In Russian, pink (розовый, rozovyj) is used to refer to lesbians, and light blue (голубой, goluboj) refers to gay men.

== Pink–blue reversal ==
In a 2017 letter to Archives of Sexual Behavior, researcher Marco Del Giudice commented on earlier claims about a supposed shift in pink–blue color associations or preferences sometime around the 1940s, from pink for boys and blue for girls before that period, to the opposite alignment afterward. He summarized his earlier work from 2012 which found "no evidence of either reversed or inconsistent usage prior to the 1940s". Del Giudice called this theory the "Pink–blue reversal" (PBR), and said it was "usually attributed to [Jo] Paoletti", and quoted from five academic articles that reprised the theory of "pink is for boys" prior to the 1940s. However, he found upon analysis that it was exceptionally difficult to actually document such a shift, and exclaimed upon "the thinness of the evidence presented in support of the PBR".

In his 2012 paper, Del Giudice quoted from four articles published in academic journals which all echoed the claims about PBR theory, many relying on Paoletti, including Chiu et al., 2006: "Prior to that decade, Paoletti ... noted that the sex-dimorphic color coding of pink and blue was inverted, i.e., infant boys were dressed in pink and infant girls were dressed in blue"; Frassanito & Pettorini (2008): "At one point, pink was considered more of a boy's color ... blue was considered more for girls"; Cohen (2013): "the current stereotypical American assignment of pink to girls and blue to boys was reversed a century ago"; and Zucker (2005): "Yet, in the first two decades of the twentieth century, there is evidence that the gender-dimorphic nature of these two colors was inverted, that is, blue was judged to be stereotypically feminine whereas pink was judged to be stereotypically masculine." But Paoletti never made the claim that pink and blue reversed, only that there was inconsistent usage that took until the 1950s to resolve starting from the first appearances of gendered pink and blue color associations around the 1860s.

== Academic research ==
A 2007 British study found a preference among women for reddish colors, and theorized that it might have had evolutionary advantages.

Studies of color preferences of infants and toddlers found a preference for primary colors, with no differences between boys and girls. By the age of two, girls started to prefer pink, and by four, boys started to reject it. This is around the same time as infants start to become aware of gender.

In an attempt to test previous research indicating an apparent preference in Britain for blue-green hues among males and pink-purple among females, a 2018 cross-cultural study compared Indian and British students. Standardized personality tests were administered to determine links possible between personality traits, gender, and color. Results confirmed previous studies, showing similar gender differences across both culture groups, with females in both groups showing a preference for pink, in warmer shades for Indian women and cooler for British women. Authors reported "a remarkable cross-cultural similarity in men and a subtle but significant cultural difference in women whose origin is yet to be explained".

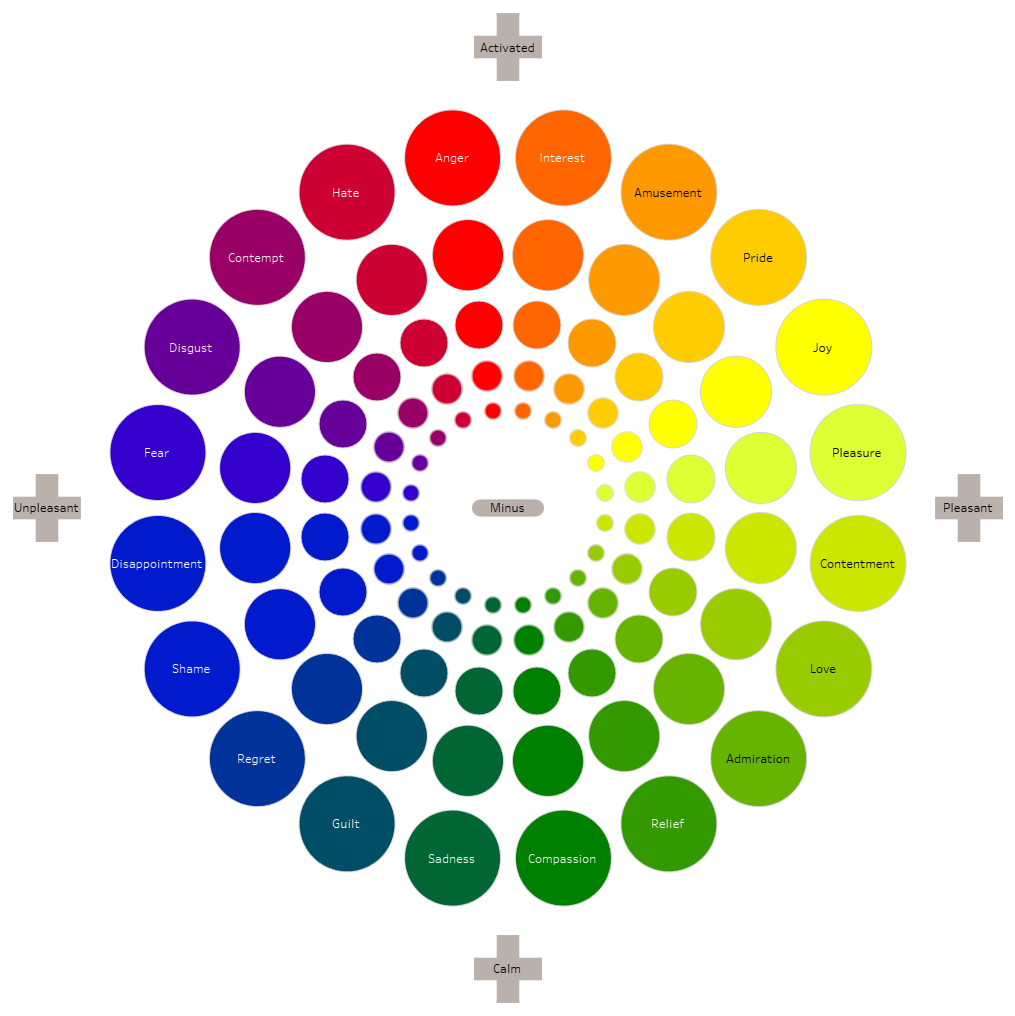
Geneva Emotion Wheel

Results of a cross-sectional study of color preferences among Swiss children and adults were published in 2018 in Sex Roles. The study found that blue was not a gendered color, but that pink is. Among children, blue was the favorite color of both girls and boys. There was a greater preference for pink/purple hues among girls, and a greater preference for red among boys. Among adults, no group chose pink as their favorite, blue was a common favorite among both, and women preferred red more than men did. A further study tested positive or negative emotional associations of pink, blue, and red among Swiss adults using the Geneva Emotion Wheel. All three hues were associated with positive emotions to the same extent among men and women. Where there were gender-based differences, pink was found to elicit more positive associations among women.

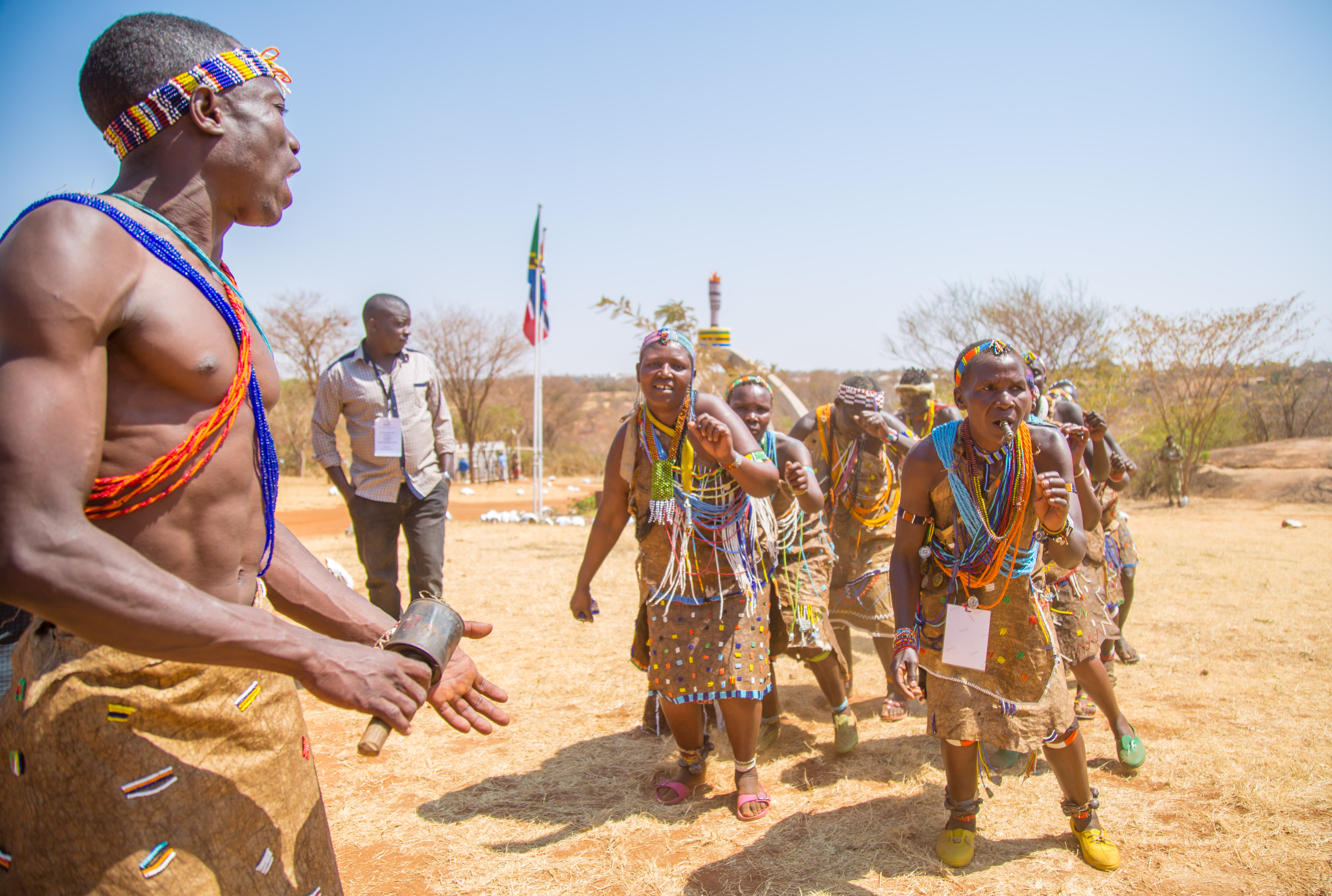
Hadzabe dance, Tanzania

Most studies have taken place in western industrialized societies, and some evidence appeared to show a cross-cultural pattern. A 2019 study published in Perception was designed to test this hypothesis, and was conducted among a hunter-gatherer culture in Africa. The study found that the color preferences among the Hadza people in Tanzania differed from those of previous studies, and that their color preferences were the same for men and for women. The researchers concluded that their study called into question previous hypotheses that color preference might have an innate association with gender, and suggested that more studies would be needed to determine what the actual factors are in color preferences among the genders.

Research questioning the color preferences of male and female children in regard to specific products is minimal; however, analysis of the research available implies that there are common color preferences among boys and girls in relation to their clothing choice.

In a study conducted in Turkey, the aim was to identify which colors are preferred for which garment types by girls and boys, and whether or not the color preferences of children differ according to age, sex, and garment type. It was determined that the colors preferred most by most of the girls for all garment types were magenta, red-violet, red, and red-orange; similarly, the colors preferred by the boys for all garment types were black, blue, cyan, and yellow. Despite the lack of cross cultural analysis on this topic, existing research indicates that children's clothing resides on a spectrum that has expectations which fluctuate depending on age, gender, location, class, and many more intersectional markers.

== Reactions ==
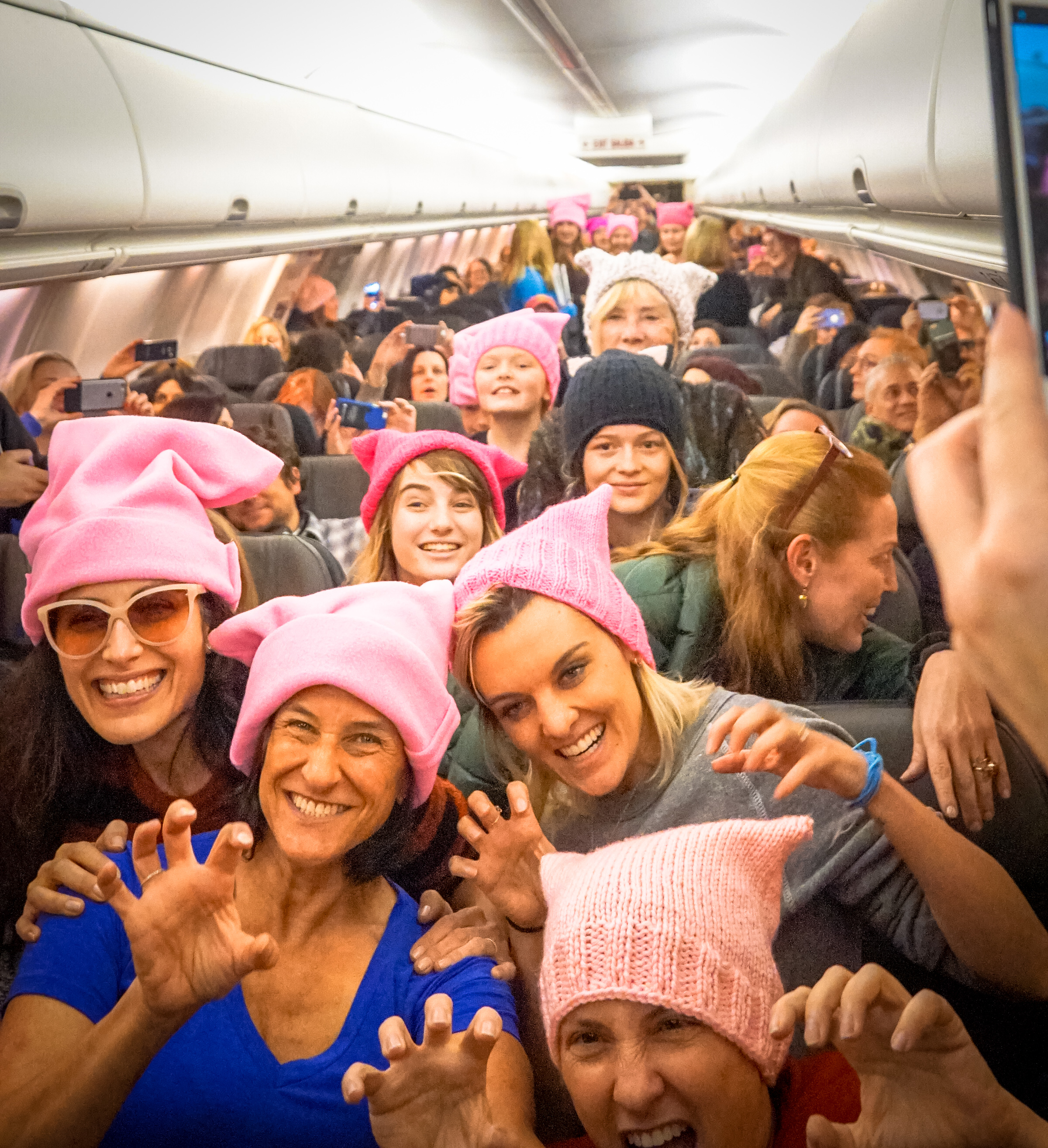
Women wearing pink hats

The association of pink with little girls and toys leads some to view pink for women as unserious or infantilizing. In a 2017 column in The Washington Post, columnist Petula Dvorak wrote about her fears that the Women's March scheduled for the day after the inauguration of U.S. President Donald Trump in January 2017 would not be taken seriously, because of the proliferation of pink pussy hats being prepared for the occasion by women planning to attend.

The same connection can be drawn between men and the potential for limitations associated with the color blue in western society. Oftentimes men are marketed clothing and products that are associated with their socially acceptable color scheme of various blues, greens, and dark tones; this is something that can be observed in advertising as well as store fronts. With this push for a connection between blue and masculinity, there can be instances of gender backlash which refers to social penalties directed at people who violate gender norms.

== See also ==
- Baby blue – Light shade of blue
- Color psychology – Study of influence of color on human behavior
- Color symbolism – Use of color for symbolic purposes
- Girls' toys and games
- Boys' toys and games
- Kruithof curve – Region of color temperatures that are often viewed as pleasing to an observer
- Let Toys Be Toys – Advocacy campaign
- List of historical sources for pink and blue as gender signifiers
- Pink ribbon culture – Effort to raise awareness and reduce the stigma of breast cancer
- Pink Ribbons, Inc. – 2011 Canadian film
- Pinkstinks – Campaign from the United Kingdom
- Pinkwashing (breast cancer) – Form of cause marketing that uses a range of pink ribbon logos

== Works cited ==
- "Why girls 'really do prefer pink'". BBC News. 21 August 2007.
- Bayle-Mouillard, Élisabeth-Félicie (1834). Manuel complet de la maitresse de maison et de la parfaite ménagère: contenant les meilleurs moyens pour la conservation des substances alimentaires, la préparation des entremets nouveaux, glaces, confitures, liqueurs; les soins à donner aux enfans, etc [Complete manual of the housewife and the perfect hostess: containing the best methods for conservation of food items, preparation of new desserts, ice creams, jams, liqueurs; childcare, etc]. Paris: Librairie encyclopédique de Roret.
- Beeton, Samuel Orchart; Ward Lock (eds.). "The Fashions". The Englishwoman's Domestic Magazine: An Illustrated Journal Combining Practical Information, Instruction, and Amusement. 5 (25). London: S.O. Beeton: 142.
- Blegvad, Kaye (1 October 2019). The Pink Book: An Illustrated Celebration of the Color, from Bubblegum to Battleships. Chronicle Books. pp. 71–74. ISBN 978-1-4521-7504-1. OCLC 1103440338.
- Bologna, Caroline (16 August 2018). "How Gender Reveals Became Such A Thing". HuffPost.
- Bonnardel, Valérie; Beniwal, Sucharita; et al. (April 2018) [1st pub. 11 October 2017]. "Gender difference in color preference across cultures: An archetypal pattern modulated by a female cultural stereotype". Color Research & Application. 43 (2): 209–223. doi:10.1002/col.22188.
- Chiu SW, Gervan S, Fairbrother C, et al. (2006). "Sex-Dimorphic Color Preference in Children with Gender Identity Disorder: A Comparison to Clinical and Community Controls". Sex Roles. 55 (5–6): 385–395. doi:10.1007/s11199-006-9089-9. S2CID 144882201.
- Chrisman-Campbell, Kimberly (1 December 2020). The Way We Wed: A Global History of Wedding Fashion. Running Press. ISBN 978-0-7624-7028-0. OCLC 1162339954.
- Cohen, Philip N. (April 2013). "Children's Gender and Parents' Color Preferences". Archives of Sexual Behavior. 42 (3): 393–397. doi:10.1007/s10508-012-9951-5. PMID 22456854. S2CID 5572044.
- Conis, Elena C.; Eder, Sandra; Medeiros, Aimee (14 May 2021). Pink and Blue: Gender, Culture, and the Health of Children. Critical issues in health and medicine. Rutgers University Press. p. 19. ISBN 978-1-978809-85-7. "Just as He-Man had taken over children's television in the 1980s, a series of successful Disney princesses—The Little Mermaid, Beauty And The Beast, Aladdin, Pocahontas, and Mulan—ushered in what has been labeled 'girlie-girl culture' in the 1990s. This feminine turn of children's consumer culture came with its own official color: pink. Pink reigned supreme as marketing campaigns utilized what was perceived to be a 'strong association' between gender and certain color palettes. Bold colors conveyed maleness while pastel colors signals femininity. When single colors were used, companies chose pink, lavender, and purple, to target girls and sometimes blue to target boys, albeit inconsistently. As online shopping grew in popularity, gendered color-coding migrated to the new medium. A study of the gender marketing of toys on the Disney store website found that '85% of toys that had red, black, brown, or gray as their most predominant color were for "boys only", while 86.2% of toys that were pink were for "girls only" '. Pink prove to be a powerful and direct signal to consumers about which products were specifically being marketed to girls and their parents."
- Del Giudice, Marco (2012). "The Twentieth Century Reversal of Pink-Blue Gender Coding: A Scientific Urban Legend?". Archives of Sexual Behavior. 41 (6): 1321–1323. doi:10.1007/s10508-012-0002-z. hdl:2318/1852738. ISSN 0004-0002. PMID 22821170. S2CID 207782208.
- Del Giudice, Marco (29 June 2017). "Pink, Blue, and Gender: An Update". Archives of Sexual Behavior. 46 (6). Springer Science+Business Media: 1555–1563. doi:10.1007/s10508-017-1024-3. hdl:2318/1853049. PMID 28664466. S2CID 44806428.
- Dvorak, Petula (12 January 2017). "The Women's March needs passion and purpose, not pink pussycat hats". The Washington Post.
- "La Mujer Moderna". El Mundo ilustrado. Vol. 2, no. 18. Mexico: Rafael Reyes Spíndola. 29 October 1899. p. 314. OCLC 4960966.
- Frassanito, Paolo; Pettorini, Benedetta (4 January 2008). "Pink and blue: the color of gender". Child's Nervous System. 24 (8). Springer-Verlag: 881–882. doi:10.1007/s00381-007-0559-3. PMID 18176808. S2CID 6510123.
- Garcia-Navarro, Lulu (28 July 2019). "Woman Who Popularized Gender-Reveal Parties Says Her Views On Gender Have Changed". NPR.
- Garnier, Athanase (1823). La Cour de Hollande sous le règne de Louis Bonaparte [The Dutch Court in the Reign of Louis Bonaparte]. Paris, Amsterdam: Chez Persan.
- Gieseler, Carly (9 February 2017). "Gender-reveal parties: performing community identity in pink and blue". Journal of Gender Studies. 27 (6): 661–671. doi:10.1080/09589236.2017.1287066. ISSN 0958-9236. S2CID 151390917.
- Grisard, Dominique (19 August 2019). "Pink and Blue Science". In Wülfingen, Bettina Bock von (ed.). Science in Color: Visualizing Achromatic Knowledge. De Gruyter. ISBN 978-3-11-060521-1.
- Groyecka, Agata; Witzel, Christoph; Butovskaya, Marina; Sorokowski, Piotr (May 2019). "Similarities in Color Preferences Between Women and Men: The Case of Hadza, the Hunter-Gatherers From Tanzania" (PDF). Perception. 48 (5). SAGE: 428–36. doi:10.1177/0301006619840937. PMID 30982405. S2CID 115203988.
- Hammond, Claudia (17 November 2014). "The 'pink vs blue' gender myth". BBC Future.
- Hendershot, Heather (1996). "8 Dolls: odour, disgust, femininity, and toy design". In Kirkham, Pat (ed.). The Gendered Object. Manchester University Press. p. 99. ISBN 978-0-7190-4475-5. OCLC 264991421.
- Jonauskaite, Domicele; Dael, Nele; et al. (15 May 2019). "Pink for Girls, Red for Boys, and Blue for Both Genders: Colour Preferences in Children and Adults". Sex Roles. 80 (9–10). Springer Nature: 630–642. doi:10.1007/s11199-018-0955-z. ISSN 0360-0025. S2CID 149509070.
- Kohl, Johann Georg (1842). Russia: St. Petersburg, Moscow, Kharkoff, Riga, Odessa, the German Provinces on the Baltic, the Steppes, the Crimea, and the Interior of the Empire. Chapman and Hall.
- Kueber, Pam (30 September 2009). "Mamie Eisenhower and 'Mamie pink': More insight from Gettysburg". retro renovation (in French).
- London, Lela (20 July 2020). "From 'Bic For Her' To Bic For Them – How Cancel Culture Got Bic Back On Track". Forbes.
- Maglaty, Jeanne (7 April 2011). "When Did Girls Start Wearing Pink?". Smithsonian. Smithsonian Institution. ISSN 0037-7333.
- Paoletti, Jo B. (6 February 2012). Pink and Blue: Telling the Boys from the Girls in America. Indiana University Press. ISBN 978-0-253-00130-6., p. 124
- Pasche Guignard, Florence (September 2015). "A Gendered Bun in the Oven. The Gender-reveal Party as a New Ritualization during Pregnancy". Studies in Religion/Sciences Religieuses. 44 (4): 479–500. doi:10.1177/0008429815599802. ISSN 0008-4298. S2CID 220373650.
- "Fashions for March". Peterson's Magazine. C.J. Peterson. 1856. p. 261.
- Rivadeneyra, Sucesores de (14 December 1896). "Correspondencia particular". La Moda elegante ilustrada: periódico de las familias [Elegant Fashion Illustrated: The Family Newspaper]. Vol. 55. Madrid: Sucesores de Rivadeneyra. OCLC 934292885.
- Schorman, Rob (Autumn 2013). "Pink and Blue: Telling the Boys from the Girls in America by Jo B. Paoletti (review)". Register of the Kentucky Historical Society. 111 (4): 622–623. doi:10.1353/khs.2014.0003. ISSN 2161-0355. S2CID 162211342 – via Project MUSE.
- Sulik, Gayle A. (2010). Pink Ribbon Blues: How Breast Cancer Culture Undermines Women's Health. USA: Oxford University Press. ISBN 978-0-19-974045-1. OCLC 535493589.
- Zucker, Kenneth J. (August 2005). "Measurement of Psychosexual Differentiation". Archives of Sexual Behavior. 34 (4): 375–388. doi:10.1007/s10508-005-4336-7. PMID 16010461. S2CID 18953324.
