= List of historical sources for pink and blue as gender signifiers =

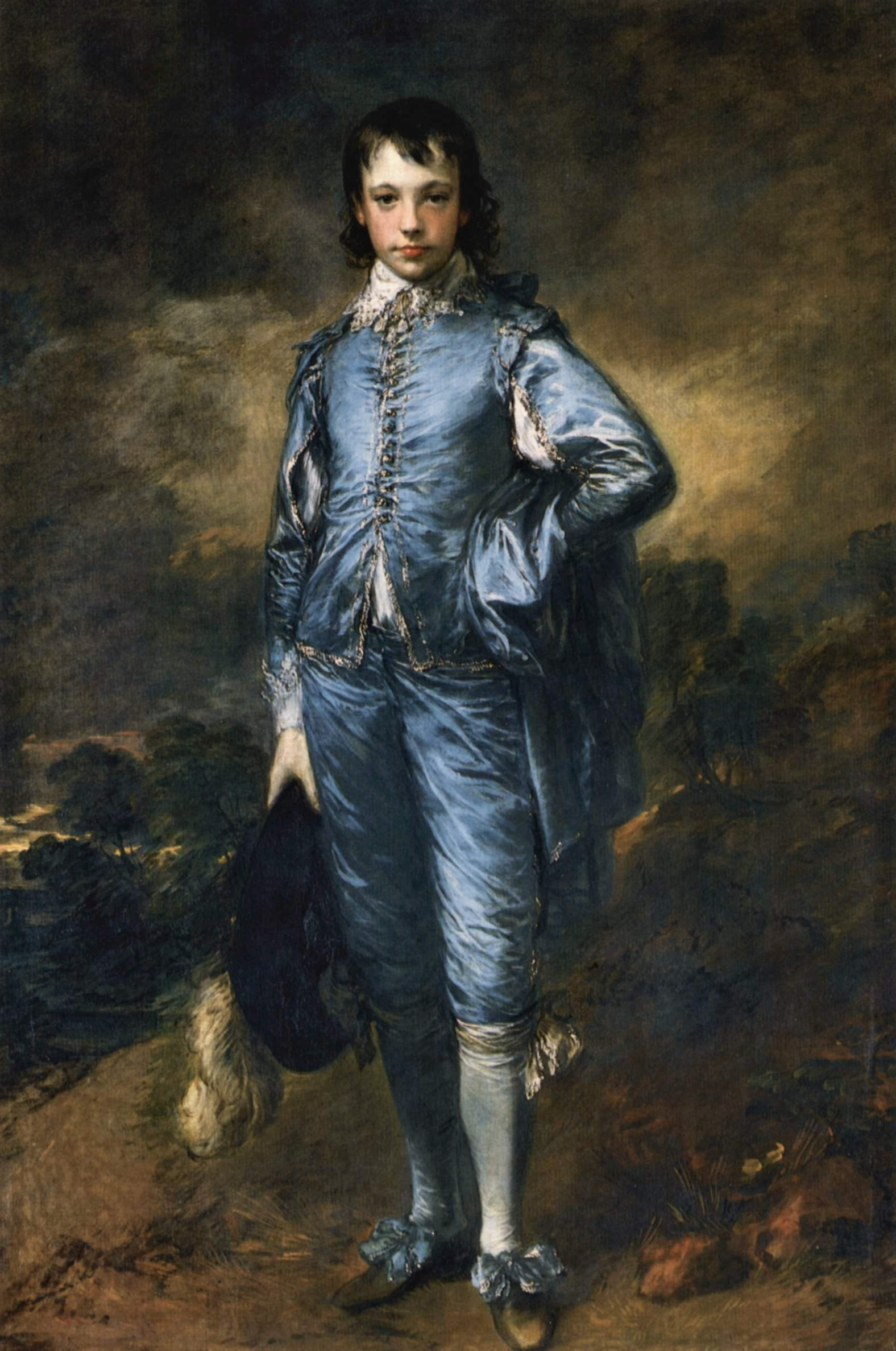
The Blue Boy (Thomas Gainsborough, 1779)

Portrait of a young girl in pink dress (Raimundo de Madrazo y Garreta, 1890s)

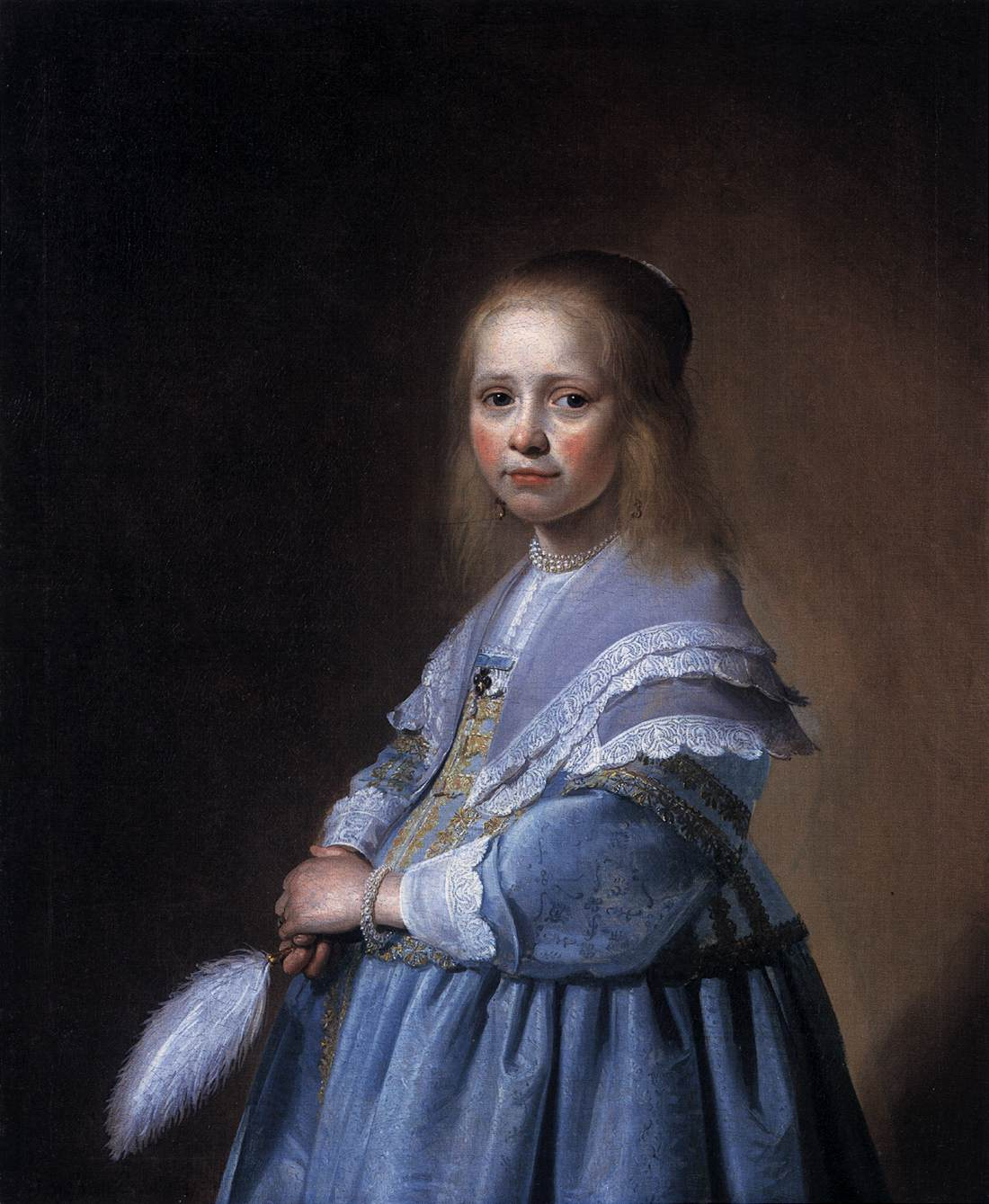
Johannes Cornelisz Verspronck's Portrait of a Girl in Blue Dress (1641)

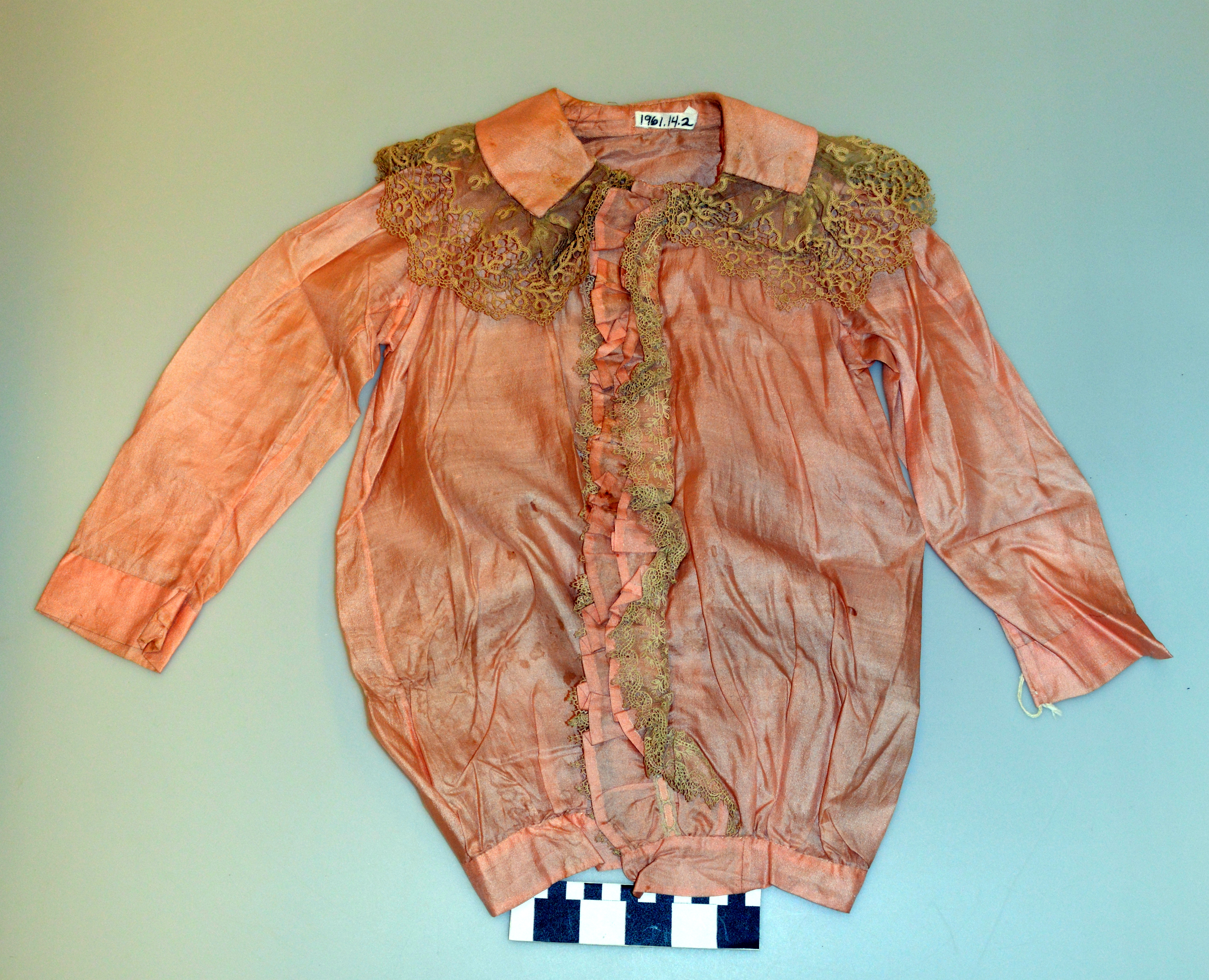
Boy's pink silk shirt (Missouri, circa 1890)

Since at least the 19th century, the colours pink and blue have been used to indicate gender, particularly for babies and young children. The current tradition in the United States (and an unknown number of other countries) is "pink for girls, blue for boys".

Prior to 1940, two conflicting traditions coexisted in the U.S., the current tradition, and its opposite, i.e., "blue for girls, pink for boys". This was noted by Paoletti (1987, 1997, 2012).

Since the 1980s, Paoletti's research has been misinterpreted and has evolved into an urban legend: that there was a full reversal in 1940, prior to which the only tradition observed was the opposite of the current one. Quoting the concluding lines of this study: "In conclusion, there are strong reasons to doubt the validity of the standard PBR [pink-blue reversal] account; if anything, gender-color associations seem to be much more stable than currently believed"

== Key to tables ==
Year = year of publication
Location = place to which text pertains
Comments = brief quote from original text

== Pink for girls, blue for boys ==
=== 19th century ===
Year	Location	Comments
1823	Netherlands; Haarlem	La Cour de Hollande sous le règne de Louis Bonaparte, by Athanase Garnier, 1823 L'accouchement des dames, me dit-elle, s'annonce de cette manière, et quand la pelotte est fond rose, c'est le signe de l'avènement en ce monde d'une petite fille, tandis que la pelotte fond bleu annonce que c'est un garçon.... Ladies Childbirth, she said, is announced in this manner, and when the pincushion is pink background, this is a sign of the coming into this world a little girl, while the blue background pelotte announces that it is a boy.
1834	France; Paris	Manuel complet de la maitresse de maison et de la parfaite ménagère, by Élisabeth-Félicie Bayle-Mouillard; Chapitre XXIII, Des soins à donner aux enfans / Care to give to children, De la layette / Baby clothes Assez communément, dans ce dernier cas, ou doublé de satin rose s'il s'agit d'une petite fille, et de satin bleu s‘il s'agit d'un garçon. Quite commonly, in the latter case [of using muslin], or double [ruffles], pink satin is used in the case of a little girl, and blue satin if it is a little boy.
1842	Russia; St. Petersburg	Russia: St. Petersburg, Moscow, Kharkoff, Riga, Odessa, the German Provinces.... by Johann Georg Kohl On the front of many shops you see inscribed, in gilt letters, "Coffins sold here;" and within you find hundreds of those narrow houses, piled upon and beside one another, for all religions, for all ranks, for all ages; black, with golden crosses for the protestants [sic], brown and light colours for Russians of the Greek church, rose-coloured ones with white lace, for young girls; azure blue for boys.
1844	Russia; St. Petersburg	Commercial statistics: A digest of the productive resources, commercial legislation, customs tariffs, navigation, port, and quarantine laws, and charges, shipping, imports and exports, and the monies, weights, and measures of all nation. Including all British Commercial Treaties with Foreign States. In three volumes by John MacGregor In all the upholsterers' shops, except the one alluded to, there are piles of coffins ready for all ages, sexes, ranks, and religions. Brown, purple, and light coloured ones for the Greco-Russians; black with gold ornaments for Protestants; rose-coloured ones decked with white laces for young girls; bright blue for boys.
1849	France; Paris	François le Champi: Comédie en 3 actes et en prose. Par George Sand (Elle aperçoit le bouquet.) Ah ! par exemple, voilà un bouquet qui s’est planté là tout seul, car je n’ai vu personne. C’est pour moi, bien sûr. (Examinant les rubans.) Du rose ! c’est une fille à marier;… du bleu ! un garçon qui veut épouser;… un ruban noir ! c’est pour dire qu’on plaint mon deuil; ... (She sees the bouquet.) Oh, my! Here is a bouquet that just planted itself, because I did not see a soul. It is for me, of course. (Examining the ribbons.) Pink! it's a girl to be married;... blue! a boy who wants to marry;... a black ribbon! it says they're sorry for my grief; ...
1856	France; Paris	The Illustrated London News - volume 19 - page 298; THE IMPERIAL LAYETTE. As everything connected with the birth of the heir of the French throne... But as blue is the colour appropriated to male children, as rose or pink is to those of the opposite sex....: Godey's Magazine, volumes 52-53 edited by Louis Antoine Godey, Sarah Josepha Buell Hale; But as blue is the color appropriated to male children, as rose or pink to those of the opposite sex....: Putnam's Monthly - volume 7 - page 558; The World of New York: A layette (that is, baby clothes) must be prepared. Shall it be a layette of pink, for girl, or a layette of blue, for a boy?
1856	USA; Philadelphia	Peterson's Magazine, vol. XXIX, Philadelphia, March 1856, No. 3. page 261 FASHIONS FOR MARCH. Fig. XI.--Cap for Christening.--The crown is made of Valenciennes.... On the left side of the cap, in the plaits of the band, is a pretty rosette of No. 4 blue ribbon, if for a boy, pink for a girl.
1856	France; Paris	Manuel géométrique du Tapissier, etc., by Jules Verdellet - page 218 Assez souvent on garnit l'intérieur de la capote en soie bleue pour les petits garçons, et en soie rose pour les petites filles, cette soie qui est toujours ouatée et piquée, forme transparent sous les fronces en mousseline des fuseaux de la capote. Quite often, the inside of the bonnet is lined with blue silk for boys and pink silk for girls. This silk, always padded and quilted, is visible through muslin gathers of the bonnet's spindles.
1857	Netherlands; Haarlem	Revue de Paris, 1857, volume 39, page 389, article by Théophile Gautier, Maxime Du Camp, editor En Hollande—Lettres a un ami - ...j’aperçus sur une porte une sorte de large pelotte ensoie rose enrichie de dentelles....I saw on the door a kind of large bundle of pink silk decorated with lace. I quickly sought information and learned that, when a woman has just given birth, they inform passers-by putting this item on the door whose Dutch name impossible to remember, pronounce and even write, but means: proof of birth. It is pink for girls and blue for boys. This bizarre practice was introduced here, they say, during the time of the Spaniards.
1858	France; Paris	Journal des demoiselles - page 157...terminé par une garniture assortie aux revers du corsage; au-dessus de la manche, tu placeras un nœud en ruban de taffetas, bleu pour un garçon, rose pour une fille......finished with a trim matching the lapels of the bodice; place a bow of taffeta ribbon above the neck, blue for a boy, pink for a girl...
1859	France; Paris	La science du Monde, politesse, usages - bien-être, by Anaïs Lebrun Bassanville, page 149 Du Baptême - Ces bonnets peuvent être entièrement blancs. Sinon la couleur rose est d'obligation pour une fille et le bleu pour un garçon. The Baptism - These caps can be completely white. Otherwise, pink is a must for a girl and blue for a boy.
1861	UK; London	London Lady's Newspaper And Pictorial Times, November 16, 1861, page 308, col. 2 Fig. 5. (Baptismal Robe.)—A broad sarsnet ribbon passed across one shoulder is fixed in a bow on the opposite side of the waist; the long ends flowing over the skirt of the robe. For a boy this ribbon should be blue, and for a girl pink.
1861	Russia	The monthly packet of evening readings for younger members of the English church, July, 1861, part 127 Sketches of the offices of the Greco-Russian Church; Little babies have their christening shirt put on... A little boy's wrapper is bound round the waist and confined at the wrists by blue ribbons, and an amber, wooden, or stone cross—no matter, so that it be not silver or gold—is put round his neck by a blue ribbon. A little girl's dress is the same, but with pink ribbons.
1862	USA; NYC	Harper's New Monthly Magazine, No. CXLIII-April, 1862-Vol. XXIV-No. 143, page 720 Fashion for April - Furnished by Mr. G. Brodie, 300 Canal Street, New York, and drawn by Voigt from actual articles of Costume. The Infant's Robe is specially designed for baptismal use. It is composed of fine nansouk and insertion. If the child is a boy, the ribbon sash is blue; if a girl, it is of pink taffeta.
1862	UK; London	The Englishwoman's Domestic Magazine, volume 5, Issue 25 - volume 6, issue 36, page 142 For very tiny mites, there is nothing prettier than French merino or mousseline-de-laine in blue or pink; the former for a boy, the latter for a girl.
1862	France; Paris	La Mode illustrée: journal de la famille, June 23, 1862 DEVIS DE LAYETTE - Une robe de baptême.... ...rose pour une petite fille, - bleu pour un petit garçon. QUOTE LAYETTE - A christening gown .... pink for a little girl - blue for a boy.
1863	France; Paris	La Mode illustrée: journal de la famille, March 16, 1863 Robe de baptême - Selon la coutume de Paris, on met sous cette robe une robe rose pour une petite fille, bleue pour un petit garçon. According to the custom of Paris, under the baptisme robe is a pink dress for a little girl, blue for a little boy.
1864	France; Paris	La Mode illustrée: journal de la famille - page 185, June 12, 1864 Berceau orne - Le berceau est habillé avec de la percaline rose pour une petite fille, bleue pour un petit garçon, si l'on veut suivre la coutume de Paris.... Ornamented cradle - The cradle is dressed with pink calico for a little girl, blue for a little boy, if we want to follow the custom of Paris....
1868	Russia	Sketches of the Rites and Customs of the Greco-Russian Church, H. C. Romanoff, page 66 - On the Feast of the Annunciation the christening was to come off.... The godfather provides a gold cross (we are speaking of a noble's family...) about an inch and a half in length, to hang round the child's neck, if a boy by a blue ribbon, if a girl a pink one. He also pays the Priest's fee. page 236 - A little boy's wrapper is bound round the waist and confined at the wrists by blue ribbons; and an amber, wooden, or stone cross—no matter, so that it not be silver or gold—is hung round his neck by a blue ribbon. A little girl's dress is the same, but with pink ribbons.
1868	France; Paris	La Mode illustrée: journal de la famille - Page 122, April 19, 1868 Bonnet de baptême - Le bonnet est garni de ruban rose (s'il est destiné à une petite fille) ou bleu (pour un petit garçon).... Baptism bonnet - The hat is trimmed with pink ribbon (if it is intended at a girl) or blue (for a boy)....
1869	USA	Good Health: A Popular Annual on the Laws of Correct Living, as Developed by Medical Science, Etc.; Bottle Babies, by Kate Gannett Wells, Boston Of course my baby was to be a bottle baby.... I was radical, progressive, hated restraint and conventionalism, and duty.... ...little wagons,—pink for girls, blue for boys,—containing shelves...holding the necks of baby bottles....
1869	USA	Little Women, part II, Good Wives by Louisa May Alcott "Are they boys? What are you going to name them?" "Boy and girl, aren't they beauties?" ... "Amy put a blue ribbon on the boy and a pink on the girl, French fashion, so you can always tell."
1869	France; Paris	La Mode illustrée: journal de la famille, December 5, 1869, page 385 Robe de baptême - ORNÉE DE GUIPURE SUR FILET ...rose pour une petite fille, bleu pour un petit garçon. Christening dress - DECORATED ON NET OF GUIPURE - pink for a girl, blue for a boy.
1870	France; Paris	Revue des deux Mondes, year XL, period 2, volume LXXXIX, September 1, 1870, page 88 Les hospices a Paris, by Maxime Du Camp; Tous les jours, la préfecture de police et les hôpitaux.... Every day, the police headquarters and hospitals send the Hospice of the Rue d'Enfer the children.... To recognize at first sight the abandoned children and children registered, they are given until the age of five years a distinctive sign, which is a necklace....with a silver medal bearing the face image of St. Vincent de Paul, the word Paris on the back, and a serial number, which is that of registration....it is blue for boys filed, pink for girls: more on the side of the coin, above the serial number, it bears the word deposit.
1875	USA	Demorest's Family Magazine, volumes 11–12, page 121, March, 1875 The prettiest trimming for a baby's cradle is to cover it first with colored silk (blue for a boy, and pink for a girl, is the Parisian fashion).
1882	USA	St. Nicholas: An Illustrated Magazine for Young Folks Donald and Dorothy by Mary Mapes Dodge "Always blue on the boy and pink on the girl — my lady's orders were very strict on that point."
1882	Netherlands; Haarlem	The Land of Dykes and Windmills: Or, Life in Holland At Haarlem, on such occasions, it is usual to place a garland ornamented with lace—more or less expensive according to the means of the resident—on the door of the house in which a birth takes place. Pink is the usual colour for a girl, and blue for a boy. It is I stated that the custom originated in 1572, when the town ...
1884	Russia; St. Petersburg	The Hawaiian Monthly, Foreign Matters, The Foundling Asylum of St. Petersburg In another room we saw six pine coffins, containing the little ones who had died that day. Their shrouds were cotton cloth, scalloped by scissors and the sleeves and wrists, with a pink bow in the cap if a girl, and blue if a boy.
1887	France	La vertu en France, by Maxime Du Camp, 1887, page 358 Le costume est uniforme: robe de cotonnade rose pour les fillettes, de cotonnade bleue pour les garçons. Quand les familles sont trop pauvres pour fournir ce vêtement, on le leur donne. The outfit is standard: a pink cotton dress for girls, blue cotton for boys. When families are too poor to provide this garment, it is given to them.
1887	France; Paris	Les beaux jours de l'impératrice Marie-Louise, by Imbert de Saint-Amand, page 300, Paris: E. Dentu. (1887) La comtesse de Montesquiou, femme du plus haut mérite... The Countess de Montesquiou, wife of the highest merit, was appointed governess to the children of France, with two sub-governesses and Mrs Mesgrigny Boubers, which were joined later a third, Madame Soufflot. Is chosen as a beautiful nurse and robust woman, married to a carpenter of Fontainebleau, and they prepared two small beds, blue for a prince, pink for a princess. The layette, estimated at three hundred thousand francs, was the admiration of all the ladies of the court.
1887	USA; NYC	Harper's Bazaar, volume 20, page 874, December 31, 1887 ANSWERS TO CORRESPONDENTS - U.—Pink is the color for baby girls’ ribbons, and blue for boys. There is no new form of announcing the birth of an infant.
1888	Germany	A Heart Regained: A Novel by Carmen Sylva A white silk-lined basket filled with dainty garments stood before her; little shirts of finest linen, made with the skill of practised fingers; soft socks with blue ribbons. "Blue for a boy, pink for a girl," murmured Leonie to herself, as she smiled sweetly over her labor of love.
1888	USA; Kansas; Atchison	Atchison Daily Globe, Wednesday, July 18, 1888, Atchison, Kansas New York Fashion—Magnificent colors will be seen this fall New York, July 12—... The newest style in infants' robes is to use valenciennes lace instead of embroideries, as they are finer and more delicate. Blue satin ribbons are for boys, pink for girls.
1890	USA; New York; Hornellsville	Hornellsville Weekly Tribune November 17, 1893 New York Fashions; Mate Leroys discusses the revival of ancient styles There was a mite of a hoof of cashmere to go with it. Pink ribbons are for girls and blue for boys. Loving mothers prefer making the garments for the little strangers....
1891	Russia	Through Russia on a mustang by Thomas Stevens The nurse, with her charge, is always a conspicuous figure on the streets of a Russian city. The fantastic garb of coronet and beads constitute one of the most picturesque costumes in Russia; and you can tell by its color whether her charge is a boy or a girl. If a boy, the prevailing color will be blue; if a girl, pink.
1892	USA; Philadelphia	The Peterson Magazine BABY'S BLANKET: "Blue is used for boys', pink is for girls'.
1892	USA; Texas; San Antonio	San Antonio Daily Light April 29, 1892 The Baby's Dainty Blanket; The French think blue the most appropriate for boys, and pink for girls.
1892	Russia	L'hospice des Enfants trouvés de Mouscou CHAPITRE II - Admission des enfants. Le système d'admission des enfants abandonnés est le même à Moscou qu'à Saint-Pétersbourg.... The intake system of abandoned children is the same in Moscow as in St. Petersburg.... The person who brings a child to have them admitted receives a certificate, pink for girls, blue for boys, on which is recorded the registration number and the date of registration.
1893	USA; LA	Los Angeles Times, July 19, 1893, page 4, Col. 7 For Mama and the Baby From Our Regular New York Fashion Correspondent; The very latest nursery fad is a silkeu hammock for the new baby.... First on the net is laid a silk quilted blanket, pink for a girl, blue for a boy.... byline DALPHINE
1894	France; Paris	L'Illustration - volume 103, page 317 Le papier et le bristol blancs avec caractères noirs sont la marque de la suprême correction ou de la très grande simplicité. Certaines personnes préfèrent les couleurs symboliques: le bleu pour un garçon, le rose pour une fille. White paper or card stock with black characters are the hallmark of supreme propriety or extreme simplicity. Some people prefer symbolic colors: blue for a boy, pink for a girl.
1894	USA	The Care of Children, by Elisabeth Robinson Scovil The Baby's Toilet - Chapter XI - The Baby's Basket - It is a French fancy to have blue for a boy and pink for a girl, but pale primrose yellow, delicate green, or crimson in winter, look equally well.
1896	USA	Preparation for Motherhood by Elisabeth Robinson Scovil Some one color should be chosen for the baby's belongings and used wherever color is permissible. Pink for a girl and blue for a boy is the established usage. Pale green, crimson, and yellow are all pretty.
1896	Spain; Madrid	La Moda elegante, Madrid, December 22, 1896, page 561 CORRESPONDENCIA PARTICULAR. El rosa es más para niñas, y el azul para los niños; pero creo debe usted hacerle ó traje del color que mejor le vaya á la cara. / Pink is more for girls, and blue for boys; but I think you should make her an outfit of the colour that suits her face best. - Señora Doña Francisca I.
1898	Russia	Pacific Medical Journal, volume 41 It is then weighed, measurements made of its length, size of head and chest, which are inscribed on a card, blue for boys and pink for girls, bearing its name, age, and sex; in fact, all important data can be found upon this card.
1898	Russia	The New England Journal of Medicine How Russia Cares for her Foundlings by J. L. Hildreth, M.D., Cambridge, Mass. Read before the Cambridge Medical Improvement Society, April 25, 1898. The two sexes are distinguished by the boys having blue and the girls pink cards, bearing their names and numbers, fastened about the neck; also the same color upon some part of their clothing. It seemed odd to find, in far-off Russia, the very same assignment of colors as among the petted babies of our own land.
1898	France; Paris	The Parisian (Parisian Illustrated Review), November 1898, volume 5, number 5, page 528 FRENCH SOCIAL CUSTOMS. by Lionel Strachey; The mother's and nurse's dress is blue or pink, according to whether the child, which is clad in white, is a boy or a girl.
1899	Mexico	El Mundo ilustrado, Mexico, November 19, 1899 - volume 6, part 2 - page 314 Regalo mas usual para el niño consiste en el ropón muy lujoso con adornos rosa para las niñas azul para los niños. The more usual gift for a child is a very luxurious robe trimmed in pink for girls or in blue for boys.

=== 20th century ===
Year	Location	Comments
1900	USA; New York; Utica	Home Mission Monthly When the dues are paid, each child receives a badge—pink for girls, and blue for boys.
1900	France	La maîtresse de maison et l'art de recevoir chez soi (The hostess and the art of entertaining at home), by Baronne Staffe, 1900, page 42 Un gros nœud rose pour les filles, bleu pour les garçons, ou crème pour les uns et les autres.... A big pink bow for girls, blue for boys, or cream for both....
1901	USA	Success Library by Orison Swett Marden, G. R. Devitt Usually, the first baby's basket is lined with pink or blue—pink if a girl is desired, blue for a boy—and is covered with dotted muslin, and decked with flounces, laces, and ribbons.
1902	Madrid; Spain	Colección completa de formularios burocráticos de los... by Enrique Mhartin y Guix, Madrid, 1902, page 13 Documentes familiares y epistolares, postales y telegráficos. / Documents family and epistolary, postal and telegraph. Participaciones de nacimiento se envían dentro de los diez días siguientes, generalmente impresas en tarjetones de más ó lujo, blancos ó de fantasía, y a veces de cartulina azul para los niños y rosa para las ninas. Birth shares are shipped within the next ten days, usually printed flyer or more luxury, white or fantasy, and sometimes blue cardboard for boys and pink for girls.
1904	USA	Physical culture for babies by Marguerite and Bernarr MacFadden The old fancy of "pink for a girl" and "blue for a boy" is still a pretty tradition, yet I think the daintiest baskets I have ever seen have been entirely of white....
1906	UK; London	Salted Almonds by F. Anstey...parcels neatly tied up in ribbon—blue for boys, and pink for girls....
1906	USA; NYC	The New York Times, May 20, 1906, page 9, col. 3; Dreamland reopens and shows new glories. The Coney Island season received added impetus yesterday. Dreamland threw open its doors with the annual flourish of trumpets.... One of the old features the crowd liked best yesterday was the infant incubator exhibit. Seven sterilized infants under glass in regulated temperatures and antisepticised atmosphere slept peacefully in their little white blankets. The boys had blue ribbons tied around them and the girls pink, and not one was over two weeks old. A model sterilized nursery goes with this exhibit.
1907	USA	The Consolidated Library, volume 2 After the layette has been provided, comes the fitting out of the basket. Usually, the first baby's basket is lined with pink or blue—pink, if a girl is desired, blue for a boy—and is covered with dotted muslin, and decked with flounces, laces, and ribbons.
1908	USA	A Dictionary of Men's Wear ... page 32 Blue - the color supposed to exercise a gracious influence over the budding destinies of, and to be especially becoming and appropriate to, boy babies as, conversely, pink is for girls. page 187 Pink - alleged English for red; used only in connection with hunting coats (properly scarlet refines). Pink - a color not to be worn by boy babies.
1909	Netherlands; The Hague	San Francisco Chronicle, April 11, 1909, page 27 DUTCH AWAIT THE ROYAL BABY; It is the custom here to ornament a baby's cradle with pink ribbons for a girl and blue for a boy.
1910	USA; Indiana; Fort Wayne	Fort Wayne Journal Gazette, August 21, 1910 Luxurious Preparations for the AUTUMN BABY...and the white bassinette is trimmed with a big ribbon bowe—blue for a boy, according to the old tradition, and pink for a girl.
1911	USA	Walden's Stationer and Printer All dealers are familiar with the increasing use of special form announcements to herald the arrival of the new born. ... There are two boxes, the prevailing color of one being pink, for girls, and the other blue, for boys.
1911	Russia	Honeymooning in Russia by Ruth Kedzie Wood The few children playing there were attended by stout nurses wearing caps shaped like coronets. "Some wear blue ribbons, and some pink, do you see?" "Yes. Why?" "Blue, if their charge is a boy; pink if it is a girl."
1912	USA; SF	San Francisco Chronicle, April 14, 1912, page 10 Birth Announcement; The correct announcement card which is sent out to intimate friends within twenty-four hours after baby's arrival is a beveled edge six-inch square of highly glazed cardboard.... "Name, Date of Birth, and Signature," in blue lettering if the recent arrival is a boy and in pink for a girl.
1913	USA	Young Folk's Handbook Color: Pink for girls, Light blue for boys.
1913	USA; Indiana; Fort Wayne	Fort Wayne Journal Gazette July 6, 1913 The World of Fashion - Luxuries for King Baby; Of course everyone knows—or soon discovers—the tradition about "blue for a boy and pink for a girl" and trims her baskets according to her hopes—though many a lusty boy has had to endure girlish pink belongings, and many a lovely wee girl has gone through babyhood suffering the indignity of masculine blue.
1914	USA	Fear and Conventionality, by Elsie Clews Parsons The sexes have their own colors, beginning in the nursery with blue for boys, pink for girls.
1914	France; Paris	With the Allies by Richard Harding Davis, 1914, page 98 (1919 edition) Their straw hats and bare legs, their Normandy nurses, with enormous head-dresses, blue for a boy and pink for a girl, were, of the sights of Paris, one of the most familiar.
1915	USA; Virginia	The Cocoon: A Rest-cure Comedy, by Ruth McEnery Stuart But it's the bassinet, if you must know. Pink is for girls, Jack.
1916	UK; London	Dental Record: A Monthly Journal of Dental Science Art and Literature The Dental Clinic Card, reproduced on page 646, can be obtained from the Dental Manufacturing Co. (blue for boys and pink' for girls). The Head Teacher is expected to complete this card as far as possible in readiness for the School Dentist's visit.
1917	UK; London	England and Wales: v. 1. Introduction, General report, Charts and diagrams, Abstract of legislation, Epitomes of local reports, by E. W. Hope. v. 2. Midwives and midwifery, Voluntary work for infant welfare, Play centres and playgrounds Case papers take the form of cards, pink for girls, blue for boys.
1918	UK	The British Journal of Nursing with which is Incorporated the Nursing Record ..., volume 61, page 22 Case papers take the form of cards — pink for girls, blue for boys, grey for the expectant mothers, and white for the visitors.
1919	USA	Dry Goods Economist, J. Mackey (1919) [Formerly, the traditional colors were] pink for boys and blue for girls, but lately the order has been generally reversed, and stationers, manufacturers of infants' novelties, as well as department store buyers state that the current demand is for blue for boys and pink for girls. Still, opinions differ. Announcements may be sent out tied with white ribbons to avoid any possible controversy.
1920	USA	The Publishers Weekly, volume 98, Part 2, November 6, 1920, page 43 BABY'S RECORD By Fanny Cory and Betsy Hill; A delightfully illustrated and decorated book for preserving a complete record of those important first years of a baby's life. Exquisitely printed in two colors on fine writing stock, and bound in colors of special significance, blue for boys, and pink for girls.
1920	USA; SF	San Francisco Chronicle, September 14, 1920, page 8 Opening of Livingston Bros.' New Store Is Colorful Event; Modern Nursery; A little away from the beaten path of the models the newly installed modern nursery held a group of women enthralled with the daintiness of its appointments in "pink for girls and blue for boys."
1921	USA; NYC	Popular Science, August, 1921....maternity hospital in New York City.... The sex of the baby is indicated by the color of the beads—blue for a boy and pink for a girl.
1922	USA	Woman's Home Companion - volume 49 - page 57 An Indian Maid with bow and arrows presided at the tree, and agreeably explained that the articles in blue were for boys, and pink for girls. Each person, on payment of five cents, was permitted to shoot at the tree with bow and arrow till....
1922	USA	Vogue - volume 59, Issues 7-12 - May 1, page 106 Vogue essays on etiquette: Questions and answers What are the proper colors for the different sexes? Blue for boy. Pink for girl.
1923	USA	American Stationer and Office Manager - volume 92 - page 305 perked up in blue or pink, for boy or girl, respectively, to announce that the little stranger had arrived.
1924	unknown	Married life, or, The true romance by May Edginton "I must share them with the children; and this pink ribbon—pink for a girl, blue for a boy! It'll do for baby's bonnet. What lovely ribbon, silk all through!"
1925	USA	The Golden Book Magazine, volume 2, page 60 Blue is for boys; pink for girls.
1925	USA	Everybody's Magazine - volume 53 - page 160 "...Why should mothers buy blue for boy babies and pink for girl babies? The psychology of colors has always interested me."
1926	USA	The Jewelers' Circular - volume 93 - page 101 Colors for Birth Announcements - The Greeting Card Association, 354 Fourth Ave., New York, has issued the following bulletin... ...and the annual meeting unanimously adopted... That, effective January 1, 1927, the colors used by all members on birth announcements be blue for boys and pink for girls.
1927	USA	Bulletin - National Retail Merchants Association (U.S.) - Volume 9 - page 367 Q—What color birth announcements are used for boys and what for girls? A—Blue for boys and pink for girls.
1928	USA; LA	Los Angeles Times 7 July 1928: A5 NANCY PAGE: Re-peter Gets Bank Book and Kodak in Color by Florence La Ganke; The kodak seemed very much a gift since it came in a colored case and had a colored frame of its own. It was dainty enough for a small baby. The color of the case was blue. That is because, thought Nancy, the baby is a boy. Thank goodness, it is now considered correct to use blue for boys and pink for girls. The other color scheme always seemed wrong. Pink is a little girl's color, always. And anyway, B stands for blue and for boy. Had the baby been a girl the friend would have sent a kodak in a shade of rich rose.
1928	Ireland	The Irish Times, December 17, 1928, page 5 Then they put in their tickets through the letter-box—pink for the girls, green for the boys, which they have bought at the cash desk for 6d.—and the window of the little house is turned by the hands of hidden fairies and lo! a parcel comes round lying in the lap of Santa Claus. (Admittedly, this source assigns green to boys, rather than blue, but it does show a clear association of pink with girls, and it is possible that the ticket was blue-green in colour.)
1929	USA; Michigan	The Michigan Alumnus, volume 36 BLUE FOR BOYS, PINK FOR GIRLS; The Daily...conducted a two-day poll...on the prohibition question.... Men voted on blue ballots, women on pink, so the results could be kept separate.
1930	USA; SF	San Francisco Chronicle, April 18, 1930, page 11 Conduct and Common Sense by Anne Singleton, The Christening; An angel cake, which is all white, inside and out, would be more suitable. The baby's name might appear on it in blue letters for a boy, or pink letters for a girl, and the baby's mother would cut it.
1931	USA; Missouri; Sedalia	Sedalia Capital, February 28, 1931, page 2 Modern Etiquette by Roberta Lee; Q. In what color should a baby be dress? A. The customary colors are blue for a boy, pink for a girl.
1932	USA; New Jersey; Union	New York Times, 07 Aug 1932, page 23 Mothers Protest Blue Seal On Baby Girls' Birth Records...protesting against the color of the town's seal on birth certificates, and the town officials are considering a change of the blue seal to a neutral hue.... The mothers have petitioned that the town to use a pink seal on their baby girls' birth certificates.
1933	USA; California; Berkeley	Berkeley Daily Gazette Saturday, April 29, 1933 MODES AND MANNERS - Blue is for boys and pink for girls, according to tradition....
1934	USA	American Childhood - volume 19 - page 28 Published by the Milton Bradley Company - includes music (mostly songs with piano accompaniment). They started sewing with heavy thread, the boys' blue, and the girls' pink, and large needles.
1935	USA	The Nation's Business - Chamber of Commerce of the United States - volume 23 - page 40 To the ladies: New non-breakable nursing bottles go gay — blue for boys, pink for girls;...
1936	USA; Texas; San Antonio	San Antonio Express, December 23, 1936, San Antonio, Texas Good Taste - Reg. U. S. Pat. Office - by Francine Markel; Dear Miss Markel—I must buy a gift for a baby girl. We have had a disagreement as to whether blue is for a girl or a boy. E. H. Answer—Technically, blue is for a boy and pink for a girl. But really this question is not taken do seriously now as it once was....
1937	USA	American Druggist - volume 95 - Page 116 Once there was quite an argument among our customers as to what were official colors for babies. I learned through communicating with the Jewish Hospital nearby that blue is proper for boys and pink for girls; while white is proper for a gift if.... American Druggist - volume 95, page 116
1938	USA; New Hampshire; Portsmouth	The Portsmouth Herald August 24, 1938, page 3 THE BABY RULE: PINK FOR GIRLS, BLUE FOR BOYS by Joan Durham
1939	USA	LIFE Apr 17, 1939, page 9 (magazine advertisement for Fels-Naptha Soap) PINK is for girls. Blue is for boys. But tattle-tale GRAY for a baby? NEVER!
1939	USA; LA	Los Angeles Times 20 Mar 1939: A5 LET'S TALK IT OVER!: With Alma Whitaker ".... A girl 16 years old living half a mile from us put on a pink dress and soon she was married. In a little while her grandmother, age 79, put on a pink dress and now she's married, too." Which really helps settle that long-drawn argument about the correct colors for babies. I stood firm for pink for girls, blue for boys.
1939	Switzerland; Basel	Ciba Review - volume 3, issue 25 - volume 4, issue 48, page 1149, September 1939 Infants' Clothing, by A. Varron (page 1148); It is remarkable that pale blue as the habitual colour for boys', and pale pink for girls', christening-dresses did not become general until the nineteenth century. Prior to that time yellow was the colour for the trimmings of baptismal clothes.
1940	USA; NYC	Catalog of Copyright Entries. Part 1. [B] Group 2. Pamphlets, Etc. New Series "Pink is for girls, Blue is for boys." -C- Feb. 25th, 1939 A 98213"; Fenner and Beane, New York 21684-21689
1941	USA	The new American etiquette - Lily Haxworth Wallace - page 436 Both of these cards are punched with two holes at the top and tied with blue, pink, or white ribbon — blue for a boy, pink for a girl, or white for either.
1942	USA; NYC	The New York Times, 04 Oct 1942: page D9 Notes for the Shopper Around Town: Blackout Materials Shown, Methods Demonstrated -A Variety of Gifts; Gifts for New Babies are likely to be an expensive item.... A carriage robe or crib blanket for gala occasions is in Macy's Needlework Department for #1.29. In plushy bunny cloth (pink for girls, blue for boys)....
1943	USA; Tennessee; Kingsport	Kingsport Times August 8, 1943 'Double Talk'-Twin Members Of Younger Set; The twins have separate little beds and their personal accessories are in the traditional "blue for boys and pink for girls."
1944	USA; Texas; Abilene	Abilene Reporter-News, March 1, 1944, page 6 for and about WOMEN (section) - GRISSON GRAMS (display ad); Gift for a new baby.... Log O' Life Baby Book.... In blue for boys—pink for girls. 1.95; Ernest Grisson's 220 CYPRESS
1945	USA; NYC	New York Times, March 2, 1945, page 16 Children's styles shown in France; Paris, March 1--Boys and girls.... Some print material is used for both, but the background is blue for boys and pink for girls.
1946	USA; Iowa; Dubuque	Dubuque Telegraph Herald, October 21, 1946 Roshek's (display ad) - Cover baby with a fine all wool blanket that is all "his" or "her" very own. Pink for girls and blue for boys.
1946	France	Le folklore des Hautes-Alpes, by Arnold van Gennep, 1946 - page 51...un ruban bleu pour les garçons, rose pour les filles à La Bâtie-des-Vigneaux....a blue ribbon for boys, pink for girls at La Batie des Vigneaux.
1947	USA; Maine; Bath	Bath Independent, November 27, 1947, page 1 This Is Your Hospital - THE FOOD IS EXCELLENT; Bath Memorial Hospital....In the nursery the color scheme of blue for boys and pink for girls is carried out in the batter of blankets.
1948	USA; Racine; Wisconsin	Racine Journal Times Tuesday, May 4, 1948, Racine, Wisconsin DOROTHY DIX - Blue for boys. Pink for girls.
1949	USA	American Record Guide - volume 16 - page 98 Blue For A Boy— Pink For A Girl and Vieni Su, Victor 20- 3549. Vaughn Monroe and His Orchestra, with vocals by V. M., The Moon Men and The Moon Maids.
1949	USA; NYC	Cue: The Weekly Magazine of New York Life And Charles of the Ritz has a wonderful powder base they call Complexion Veil. ... Isn't it lucky that pink is for girls?
1950	Canada	Civic Administration - volume 2 - page 32 There was a time when we thought children were not readily affected by color, so we used baby blue for a boy's room and pink for a girl's. Today, the psychologist tells us....
1950	USA	Reno Evening Gazette, April 26, 1950, Gazette's Little University, Modern Etiquette Q. How did the custom of pink for a girl and blue for a boy originate? A. It is generally believed to have sprung from the old custom in Holland of hanging pink and blue ribbons on the door to announce a birth—Blue for a boy, and pink for a girl.
1951	USA	House Beautiful - volume 93, part 2 - page 254 The fabric used is gay — gay pink for a girl or gay blue for a boy....
1952	USA; NYC	New York Times, 09 Nov 1952: SM53 Baby's Personal Birthday Candle (display ad); Pink ribbon for girls—blue for boys. - Lion's Novelties Inc., 139 Payson Ave., New York 34, N.Y.
1953	USA; NYC	Billboard Jun 27, 1953 Weill Specialty Company, Brooklyn, has introduced a kiddie shoe bag.... The bags come in blue for boys, pink for girls.
1954	USA; Texas; Galveston	Galveston Daily News, October 20, 1954, page 14, Galveston, Texas Carter's Play-Jama...$2.95 Three-piece cotton knit set, gently elasticized, for nap time or romp time. Pink for girls, blue for boys; sizes S, M, L.
1955	USA; NYC	New York Times, 3 July 1955: part F page 9 News of the Advertising and Marketing Fields 'Remembrance' Ads; A diaper service distributes pens to new mothers, suggesting that the pen (blue for boys, pink for girls) be used for thank-you notes.
1955	USA	American Bicyclist and Motorcyclist, 1955 The big news is the "Speedflite" models L-50 and 51 — an entirely new bicycle available in 26″ and 24″ sizes with red flamboyant finish for boys and blue for girls.
1956	Ireland	The Irish Times, March 27, 1956, page 11 Advertisement for Sharpley's of Nassau Street, Dublin "Presents for the First-born."; Blue for boy. Pink for girl.
1956	USA; NYC	New York Times, May 27, 1956, page 212 Lambert Brothers (display ad), Lexington at 60th, Jewelers since 1877; The unforgettable baby gift A book whose parchment pages.... ....genuine gold leaf on blue for boys; silver on pink for girls.
1957	USA; NYC	New York Times, April 21, 1957, page 54 Gimbels (display ad) baby name bracelets...pink for girls, blue for boys.
1958	USA; NYC	New York Times, September 7, 1958, page 65 Russeks (display ad); 3-in-1 pram convertible...sleeping bag...pram suit...toddler's snowsuit... Pink for girls with bonnet. Blue for boys with helmet.
1959	USA; NYC	New York Times, April 5, 1959, page 35 Bloomingdale's (display ad); Lexington and 59th Street; Baby Sale; Two-pant suit 2.98 Originally 3.98...cotton crib set... Pink for girls, blue for boys.
1960	Austria; Tyrol	Anthropological Quarterly, Child Training among Tyrolean Peasants Infants are nowadays usually dressed in white while they are still in the carriage; when they begin to crawl they are dressed in the urban style of pink for girls, blue for boys.
1961	UK	Rubber Journal / Rubber and Plastics Weekly, volume 140, page 331 Surveys have shown that in Belgium and parts of Eastern France the ' blue for a boy and pink for a girl ' convention is reversed.
1962	USA	Fashions and fabrics: a guide to clothing selection and good grooming, with a special section on household fabrics by Lucy Rathbone Some of us still prefer the traditional "blue for boys, pink for girls."
1963	USA	Color for Interiors, Historical and Modern by Faber Birren Washrooms could be Pink for girls and Light Teal Blue for boys.
1964	USA; SF	San Francisco Chronicle, February 29, 1964, part 2, page 9 The Question Many by N.A. O'Hara; What do you wear to bed? You know the old saying about pink for girls and blue for boys.
1964	USSR	Soviet Union - Issues 167-178 - page 47 This is a new ceremony marking the birth of a child. The parents are given a memorial medal—pink if it is a girl and blue if a boy. On it are engraved the child's name, date and place of birth. VERDICT AFTER 1 26 YEARS On a cold winter's ...
1965	USA; Pennsylvania; Lebanon	Lebanon Daily News, November 11, 1965, Lebanon, Pennsylvania MILBACH SPRINGS; The first graders brought their baby pictures. These are posted in the traditional "Blue for boys" and "Pink for girls" background and colors and marked by numbers.
1966	USA; NYC	New York Times, August 14, 1966, page 305 Fortrel is for the two of you. (display ad) - FREITAG'S snuggly sleepwear.... Blue for boys; pink for girls.
1967	USA	Peter's Chair by Ezra Jack Keats When Peter discovers his blue furniture is being painted pink for a new baby sister, he rescues the last unpainted item, a chair, and runs away.
1968	USA	My wonderful world of slapstick by Buster Keaton, Charles Samuels "Pink is for girls ," I told her. "Blue is for boys." "No, pink is for boys," she insisted. I didn't argue....
1969	USA; NYC	New York Times, June 23, 1969, page 13 B. Altman & Co., Fifth Ave. Also: SPECIAL PURCHASE STRIPED COVERALLS.... Of course, blue for boys and pink for girls.
1970	USA; Colorado; Colorado Springs	Colorado Springs Gazette, April 15, 1970, page 5G (advertisement) GLOBEMASTER FALCON BIKE - Sporty looking flamboyant blue for boys pink for girls with white buddy seat, chromed wheels....
1971	USA; NYC	New York Times May 12, 1971 page 38 Using Toys to Free Children From the Roles Society Dictates by Nadine Brozan...in the nursery? No more pink for girls and blue for boys, dolls for girls...
1972	USA	The name on the White House floor, and other anxieties of our times by Judith Martin Nicky can't announce a simple tribute like "Blue is for boys; pink is for girls" without getting a long talk about sexism....
1973	USA; NYC	New York Times, November 9, 1973, page 10 (display ad) BONWIT TELLER - Resort Rompers for Binwit Babies - Blue for boys or pink for girls.
1974	USA	American education, volume 10, page 7 Results of a color-coded vocational guidance test she took (pink for girls, blue for boys) showed she had a special aptitude for....
1975	USA; NYC	New York Magazine, March 24, 1975, page 63 The Artful Lodger / Joan Kron Sheets: the new security blanket Solid-color sheets have masculine and feminine weights too—you know, pink for girls and blue for boys.
1976	USA	Urban, Social, and Educational Issues by Leonard H. Golubchick, Barry Persky, page 310...while sex-role stereotyping is all-pervasive in society, starting, for example, with infants and toddlers who learn that blue is for boys and pink is for girls...
1977	Australia	Women and Politics Conference, 1975, volume 1, page 38 I blame the men, too, but social conditioning does start in the cradle, with pink for girls and blue for boys.
1978	USA	Right from the Start: A Guide to Nonsexist Child Rearing by Selma Betty Greenberg....name cards — and of course, the blankets — are often color-coded, pink for girls and blue for boys.
1979	USA	He & she: how children develop their sex role identity by Jeanne Brooks-Gunn, Wendy Schempp Matthews...birth announcement...cards...(pink for girls, blue for boys)...
1980	Ireland	The Irish Times, December 22, 1980, page 10. In times past, there used to be blue-wrapped presents for boys, pink ones for girls and yellow ones for those under four.
1980	USA	The Lesbian Community: With an Afterword, 1980 by Deborah Goleman Wolf - page 38...a lesbian who had been in the gay community for several years, is that "pink is for girls, blue is for boys, so the color in between, lavender, is for homosexuals."
1981	USA	Children, Television, and Sex-Role Stereotyping Thus, it is blue for boys, pink for girls, dolls or toy trucks....
1982	USA	Port Arthur News, January 24, 1982, page 1C Organization: it's just a matter of time by Jane Covington, Life Editor.... Then she color codes the wrappings so that she knows gift packages in pink are for girls and those in blue for boys while yellow means the gift is appropriate for either.
1983	USA	Ways with Words: Language, Life and Work in Communities and Classrooms by Shirley Brice Heath Gifts are usually given in whites, yellows, and greens, but some women give outfits in either blue "for boys" or pink "for girls," with much joking between the mother-to-be and gift-giver about what will be done if the child is the "wrong sex"....
1984	USA	Flemish Paintings in the Metropolitan Museum of Art, volume 1 by Walter Liedtke, Metropolitan Museum of Art (New York, N.Y.) The use of blue for boys and pink for girls goes back well before Rubens's time, but, in paintings of the period, does not indicate gender reliably.
1987	UK; Northern Ireland; Ulster	Ulster Folklife - volumes 33-38 - page 49 Eventually I got my first pair glasses, blue for boys and pink for girls.... This was around 1944, and the N.H.S. was a few years away.
1988	UK; London	Social Semiotics by Gunther R. Kress Traditionally, pink is the colour for baby girls and blue for boys.
1995	Canada	Keepers of the culture: the power of tradition in women's lives (Janet Mancini Billson, 1995) In Canada, though, Ukrainians have taken on North American customs that separate males and females at birth: "Here it's pink for girls and blue for boys, white for either. Never pink for a boy, of course."

== Pink for boys, blue for girls ==
=== 19th century ===
Year	Location	Comments
1889	Italy; Naples	Journal of Education and School World - volume 21 - page 187 Froebel in Naples; These little mortals of the Kindergarten... The blouse worn by all, paying and non-paying—pink for the boys, blue for the girls—covered, it is true, dresses of very different cost and handsomeness, but all were clean and tidy. Between twelve and one o'clock the children have their "minestra" (soup) and play in the garden.
1890	USA	Ladies' Home Journal, November, page 23 Hints on Home Dress-Making by Emma M. Hooper; SELECTIONS OF COLORS AND STUFFS; Pure white is used for all babies—blue for girls and pink for boys, when a color is wished.
1891	USA	House and Hearth - page 265 In those lands where two layettes are seemingly prepared, — one with pink ribbons for the boy, and one with blue ribbons for the girl, — the sentiment is still the same, and the unknown still hangs its halo round the sacred little store.
1893	USA; NYC	New York Times, 23 July 1893: page 11, FINERY FOR INFANTS "Oh, pink for a boy and blue for a girl!" exclaims a young woman who is preparing some gifts for a newly arrived nephew.
1897	USA; NYC	New York Times, 24 Jan 1897: page 12, BABY'S FIRST WARDROBE "There are, in the first place, six knitted shirts, made of the finest Saxony; six knitted bands, and a dozen socks, assorted sizes. These are of fine, soft wool, and may be either all white or varied with pink and blue—no other colors for a little baby. The pink is usually considered the color for a boy and the blue for a girl, but mothers use their own taste in such matters....
1899	USA	Table Talk (Philadelphia), volume 14, number 11, November 1899 All Through the Year by Mrs. M. C. Myer. "Cuddledown Town"; A marked color-line now exists in the toilets and appointments of the boy and girl-baby. If a flutter of pink is noticeable as the royal carriage passes, it is safe to conclude that His Majesty "the King" is taking an airing. If light blue decorations are in evidence, behold! it is the Queen!

=== 20th century ===
Year	Location	Comments
1901	USA	Woman's Work for Woman - volume 16, page 143 Mrs. Wells of Utica excited great interest in her Baby Band and their badges, pink for boys and blue for girls.
1901	USA; NYC	New York Times, 17 March 1901: page 17 For Baby's Layette; With wool in which there is a little silk, the little sock has the lower part of blue for a girl baby and pink for the small boy, usually combined with white....
1903	USA; Kansas; Hutchinson, Kansas	The Hutchinson News, February 26, 1903, page 2 It is customary to trim the little clothes preparatory to the stork's visit with blue, if a girl is wanted, and pink for a boy.—Atchison Globe
1904	USA; Plymouth, Mass.	New York Times, 25 April 1904: page 9 In the Shops; The velvet used with them is one of two colors, pink or blue, the two colors usually see in the cradles or layettes of babies, pink for the boys, blue for the small girls.
1905	USA; NYC	New York Times, 26 March 1905: page 31 Cost of the American Baby; During their early months the little man and little woman dress exactly alike unless Master Baby should have pink for the prevailing color in his wardrobe and its accessories—the baby boy color; while Miss Baby will have blue, as that is supposed to be the girl baby color.
1905	Italy	Los Angeles Sunday Times 09 Apr 1905: VII8 A large supply of cradles At one extremity is column, bearing the emblem of Rome, a female figure wearing a helmet and holding in the right hand the royal Italian crown. The angel which supports the cradle at the other side clasps in its arms the united shields of the house of Savoy, that of the king, and the house of Montenegro, of which the queen is a member. Italian mothers and nurses always carry a small child upon a pillow, with ribbons of appropriate color—pink for a boy and blue for a girl.
1909	USA; California; Los Gatos	San Francisco Chronicle, March 10, 1909, page 3 One of the Silver Cups Be Given to a Prize Baby of Los Gatos; All boybabies are to wear a pink ribbon and all girl babies will wear a blue ribbon.
1910	USA; LA	The Los Angeles Sunday Times, September 4, 1910, part VIII, page 1 For the Baby; There are many things which can be embroidered or entirely made by the clever aunt or best friend of the new arrival's mother. Usually they should be in white, though pink for a boy and blue for a girl are also sanctioned.
1915	USA	Shoe and Leather Reporter, volume 118 Another change is the decline of patents with pink or blue uppers—blue for girl babies, pink for boys.
1915	USA	Southern Medical Journal, volume 8, issues 7–12....a postcard notice of the fact that a birth certificate has been files.... The cards are in colors—pink for boys and blue for girls—and contain spaces for names....
1915	USA; LA	The Los Angeles Sunday Times, February 7, 1915, part III, page 4 The Bright Side of Sunshine Land—People and Their Doings—a Hundred Happy Affairs: A DEBUTANTE'S LETTER. We are tremendously interested in Clara's coming event—is she banking on pink or blue? Pink for a boy, blue for a girl, you know. Lavender for twins.
1915	UK	"Spring Pictures", short story by Katherine Mansfield One shop is full of little squares of mackintosh, blue ones for girls and pink ones for boys with Bébé printed in the middle of each ...
1916	USA; NYC	New York Times, May 24, 1916, page 11. 20,000 WOMEN MEET IN ARMORY TONIGHT § Mrs. W. J. Bryan a Guest; They are talking of fixing up a day nursery to accommodate club babies at the armory so the mothers and grandmothers who have brought the babies along can attend the convention and feel that the children are safe. It will be decorated in blue, blue being the color for little girls, while pink is for boys. This is a woman's convention.
1917	USA; Pennsylvania; Warren	Warren Morning Chronicle, November 13, 1917, page 6 "Pink for boys; blue for boys," holds good in these little affairs.... —Winifred Worth
1918	USA	The Amazing Interlude by Mary Roberts Rinehart "Pink is for boys," she said, and led the way upstairs.
1920	USA	Fifty Contemporary One-act Plays The Baby Carriage, by Bosworth Crocker; Mrs. Rooney: Pink is for boys. I wanted a girl, having Mickey then.
1920	USA	The Gospel Trumpet, volume 40 Cradle Roll Certificate; A beautifully and artistically designed certificate, printed in four delicate and appropriate colors, gold and pink for boys, gold and blue for girls, predominating.
1920	USA	Good Housekeeping ..., volume 71 October advertisement for Rogers, Lunt & Bowlin Co., Silversmiths, Greenfield, Massachusetts Illustration shows a three-piece Baby Set in special Gift Box—blue for girls, pink for boys.
1926	USA	Answers to Questions by Frederic Jennings Haskin In different sections of the country there are different interpretations of colors for children. The old symbolism, however, is blue for a girl and pink for a boy.
1927	USA; Europe	Time magazine, 1927 In Catholic countries (France, Belgium, Spain, etc.) blue (the Virgin's color) is used for girls and pink for boys.
1929	USA; NYC	New York Times, 30 Mar 1929: page 7 Macy's Display Ad: Blue for a Girl and Pink for a Boy; (footnote): Some say, "pink for a girl and blue for a boy." Our advice is still: choose pink—it's prettiest.
1929	Ireland	The Irish Times, October 10, 1929: page 7 Description of a wedding party: There were six attractive children in attendance—four pages and two small girls. [The boys'] red velvet coats were worn with parchment satin trousers, copied from Raeburn's "Pink Boy" [...] Each [girl] wore a wide Leghorn hat, trimmed with blue ribbons to match the blue sash at the waist of her frock.
1930	USA	Popular Questions Answered - page 59 - George William Stimpson According to a traditional color scheme, which is of unknown origin, baby boys are properly dressed in pink clothing and baby girls in blue, although in some parts of the country, particularly in the Southern States, this symbolical color arrangement is reversed and baby boys are dressed in blue and girls in pink.
1935	USA	Yearbook - Socializing Experiences in the Elementary School ("Pink is for boys and blue is for girls," said a first-grader.)
1938	USA	Clothing the Child by Florence Elizabeth Young, page 146 Nor should one follow religiously the old rule " blue for the fair and pink for the dark" or "blue for girls and pink for boys."
1941	USA	Quincie Bolliver, by Mary King 'Pink is for boys, and blue is for girls.' 'It is not! It's the other way around!'

== Ambiguous ==
Year	Location	Comments
1849	France; Paris	Le nouveau-né de Paris, by Abbé Dubeau, page 230 Afin d'éviter toute méprise dans le service journalier d'un tel établissement, chaque pensionnaire portera un petit collier ... (ambre pour les filles, et ivoire pour les garçons)... Comme aussi le ruban qui enchaînera les grains d'ivoire et d'ambre, sera de la couleur depuis longtemps adoptée et en usage en notre pays, c'est-à-dire, bleu pour les uns, et rose pour les autres. To avoid any misunderstanding in the daily service of such a facility, each boarder will wear a small necklace ... (amber for the girls and ivory for the boys); ... As will be the ribbon on which the beads of ivory and amber will be threaded, [it] will be of the color traditionally adopted and used in our country, that is to say, blue for some and pink for others.

== See also ==
- Pink
- Blue
- Baby blue
- Gender
- Gendered associations of pink and blue
- Color code
- Pinkstinks
