= Light blue =

Light shade of blue

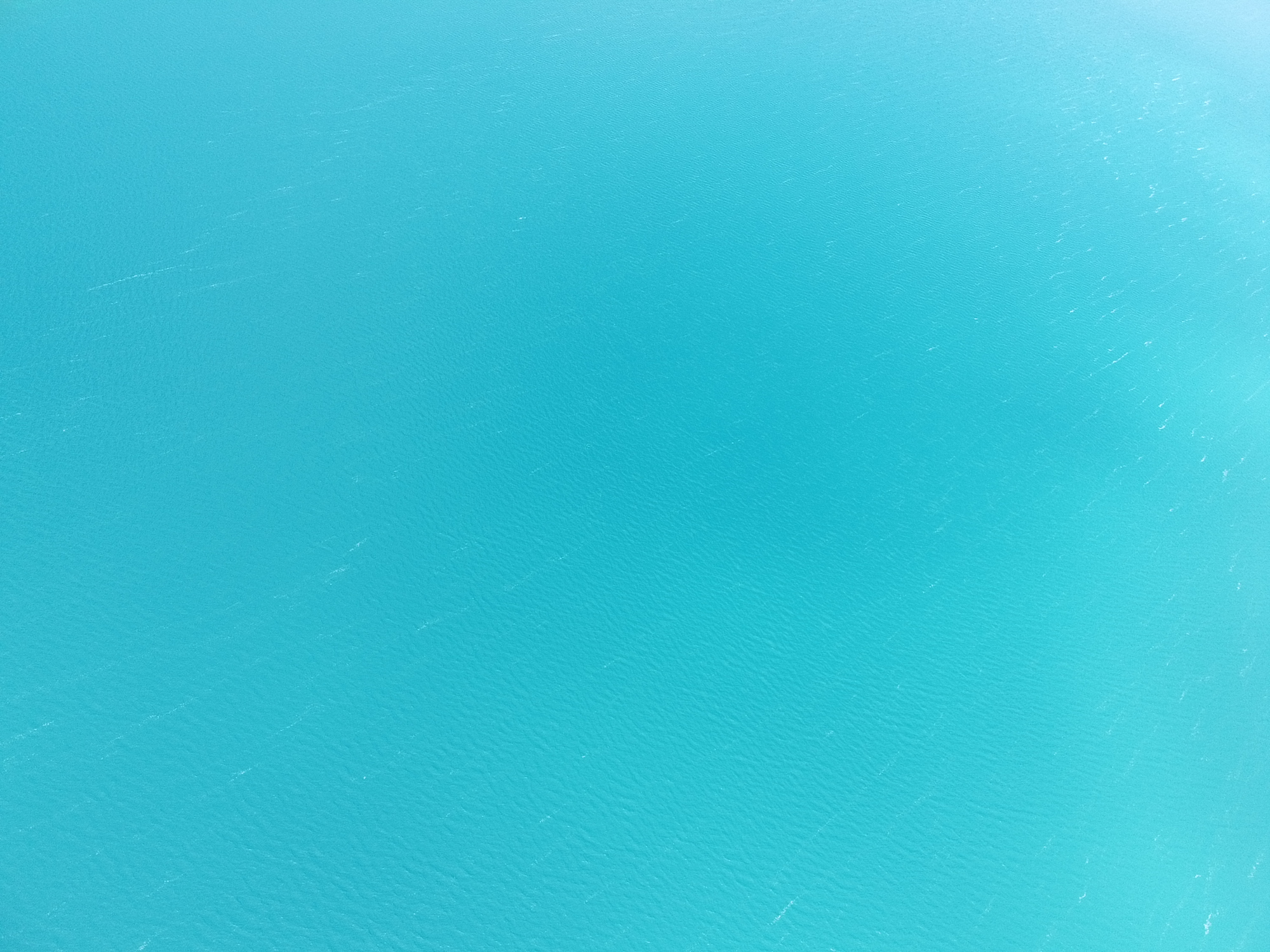
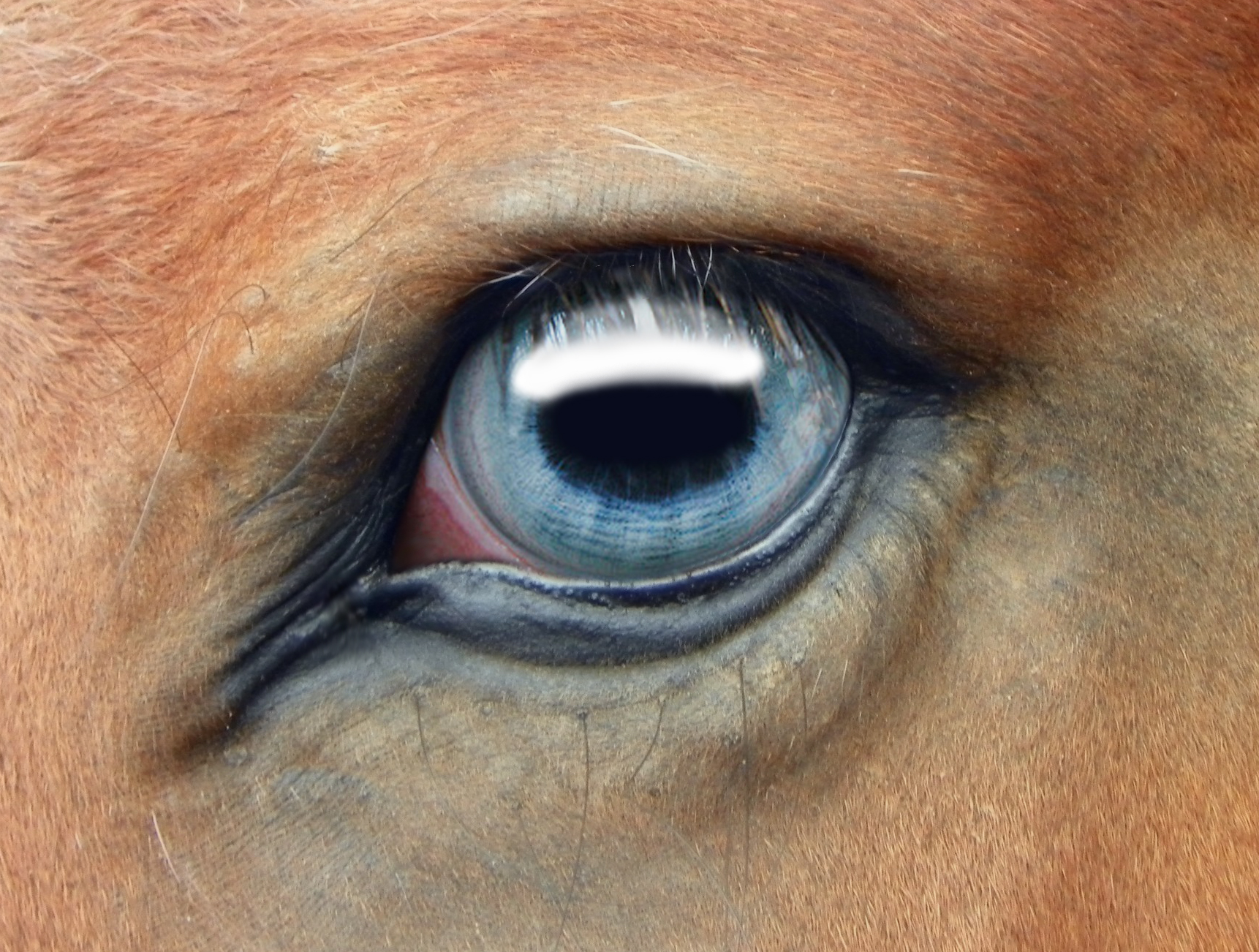
- Clockwise, from top left: Hot air balloon; Lake Bacalar in Quintana Roo, Mexico; Morpho menelaus; Chimborazo summit in Ecuador; Eye of a horse; Swimming pool in Tamul Nadu, India.

Colour coordinates
- Hex triplet: #ADD8E6
- sRGB^{B} (r, g, b): (173, 216, 230)
- HSV (h, s, v): (195°, 25%, 90%)
- CIELCh_{uv} (L, C, h): (84, 28, 216°)
- Source: ColorHexa.com
- ISCC–NBS descriptor: Very light greenish blue
- B: Normalized to [0–255] (byte)

Light blue is a color or range of colors, typically a lightened shade with a hue between cyan and blue.

The first use of "light blue" as a color term in English is in the year 1915.

In Russian and some other languages, there is no single word for blue, but rather different words for light blue (голубой, goluboy) and dark blue (синий, siniy). The Ancient Greek word for a light blue, glaukos, also could mean light green, gray, or yellow.

In Modern Hebrew, light blue, tchelet (תכלת) is differentiated from blue, kachol (כחול). In Modern Greek, light blue, galazio (γαλάζιο) is also differentiated from blue, ble (μπλε).

== Variations ==
=== Light blue (Literal interpretation) ===
Light blue (Literal interpretation)

Color coordinates
- Hex triplet: #8080FF
- sRGB^{B} (r, g, b): (128, 128, 255)
- HSV (h, s, v): (240°, 50%, 100%)
- CIELCh_{uv} (L, C, h): (59, 105, 266°)
- Source: ColorHexa.com
- B: Normalized to [0–255] (byte)

This shade is a literal light blue, or in other words, a simple combination of blue and white. It has the same hue as blue (240°) with less saturation in HSV or more lightness in HSL. The specific hex color #8080FF is also commonly used in 3D computer graphics as the base color for Normal mapping, in which it typically represents the smooth areas of the surface.

=== Light blue (Crayola) ===
Light blue (Crayola)

Color coordinates
- Hex triplet: #8FD8D8
- sRGB^{B} (r, g, b): (143, 216, 216)
- HSV (h, s, v): (180°, 34%, 85%)
- CIELCh_{uv} (L, C, h): (82, 35, 192°)
- Source: Crayola
- B: Normalized to [0–255] (byte)

Displayed at the right is the color that is called "light blue" in Crayola crayons. It was only available in 1958. Contrary to its title, it is technically a shade of cyan due to its hue of 180°.

=== Light blue (RYB) ===
Light blue (RYB)

Color coordinates
- Hex triplet: #95B0CC
- sRGB^{B} (r, g, b): (149, 176, 204)
- HSV (h, s, v): (211°, 27%, 80%)
- CIELCh_{uv} (L, C, h): (71, 30, 240°)
- Source: RYB color system
- B: Normalized to [0–255] (byte)

Displayed at the right is the color that is called "light blue" in the RYB color model. It is a mixture of blue and white.

== Light blue in human culture ==
Cartography

- In historical atlases published in Germany, light blue is traditionally used as a color to represent Germany, as opposed to pink for England, purple for France, and light green for Russia.

Heraldry and flags

- Bleu celeste (sky blue) is a non-standard tincture in heraldry and vexillology.
- The national flags of Argentina, the Bahamas, Botswana, Fiji, Guatemala, Honduras, Kazakhstan, Micronesia, Palau, Somalia, and Tuvalu all have light blue as a dominant color.

Gender

- In modern Western culture, gender norms for colours are that light blue is commonly used to represent boys as opposed to the color pink, which is used to represent girls (but see the counterexamples at List of historical sources for pink and blue as gender signifiers).

Interior design

- The color light blue is commonly regarded as calming and relaxing. Because of this, it is sometimes used to paint hospital rooms.
- Since the color light blue reminds many people of water, light blue is a popular color for painting bathrooms or for porcelain bathroom fixtures.

School colors

- Cambridge Blue is a shade of light blue adopted by the University of Cambridge, in contrast with the University of Oxford which has adopted a dark shade of blue (Oxford Blue).

Religion

- In Hinduism, Shiva, the Destroyer, is depicted in light blue tones and is called neela kantha, or blue-throated, for having swallowed poison in an attempt to turn the tide of a battle between the gods and demons in the gods' favor.
- In Christianity, light blue represents the sin of sloth.

Sexuality

- In Russian, light blue (голубой, goluboy) refers to gay men.

Other

- Azzurro, a light blue, is the national color of Italy (from the livery color of the former reigning family, the House of Savoy).
- King Louis IX of France, better known as Saint Louis (1214–1270), became the first king of France to regularly dress in blue. This was copied by other nobles. Paintings of the mythical King Arthur began to show him dressed in blue. The coat of arms of the kings of France became an azure or light blue shield, sprinkled with golden fleur-de-lis or lilies. Blue had come from obscurity to become the royal color.
- Light blue is often reported as the color of the visible light coming off of a source when ionizing radiation is released during a nuclear chain reaction. The signature "light blue glow" of Cherenkov radiation seen in nuclear reactors is a result of the constant particles and photons being ejected out of the reactor core into the water medium around it.
- In boxing, light blue is the official tone of a World Boxing Association referee's dress shirt.
