= Baby blue =

Light shade of blue

Color coordinates
- Hex triplet: #89CFF0
- sRGB^{B} (r, g, b): (137, 207, 240)
- HSV (h, s, v): (199°, 43%, 94%)
- CIELCh_{uv} (L, C, h): (80, 48, 227°)
- Source: Maerz and Paul
- ISCC–NBS descriptor: Very light greenish blue
- B: Normalized to [0–255] (byte)

Baby blue, also called light blue, is a tint of azure, which is one of the pastel colors.

The first recorded use of baby blue as a color name in English was in 1892.

== Variations of baby blue ==
=== Beau blue ===
Beau blue

Color coordinates
- Hex triplet: #BCD4E6
- sRGB^{B} (r, g, b): (188, 212, 230)
- HSV (h, s, v): (206°, 18%, 90%)
- CIELCh_{uv} (L, C, h): (84, 22, 232°)
- Source: Plochere
- ISCC–NBS descriptor: Very pale blue
- B: Normalized to [0–255] (byte)

Beau blue is a light tone of baby blue. "Beau" means "beautiful" in French.

The source of this color is the color that is called beau blue in the Plochere Color System, a color system formulated in 1948 that is widely used by interior designers.

=== Baby blue eyes ===
Baby blue eyes

Color coordinates
- Hex triplet: #A1CAF1
- sRGB^{B} (r, g, b): (161, 202, 241)
- HSV (h, s, v): (209°, 33%, 95%)
- CIELCh_{uv} (L, C, h): (80, 43, 240°)
- Source: Plochere
- ISCC–NBS descriptor: Very light blue
- B: Normalized to [0–255] (byte)

Baby blue eyes is a rich tone of baby blue.

The source of this color is the color that is called baby blue eyes in the Plochere Color System, a color system formulated in 1948 that is widely used by interior designers.

=== Little boy blue ===
Little boy blue

Color coordinates
- Hex triplet: #6CA0DC
- sRGB^{B} (r, g, b): (108, 160, 220)
- HSV (h, s, v): (212°, 51%, 86%)
- CIELCh_{uv} (L, C, h): (65, 62, 246°)
- Source: Pantone
- ISCC–NBS descriptor: Light blue
- B: Normalized to [0–255] (byte)

Little boy blue is a deep tone of baby blue.

The source of this color is the "Pantone Textile Paper eXtended (TPX)" color list, color #16-4132 TPX—Little Boy Blue.

== Baby blue in human culture ==
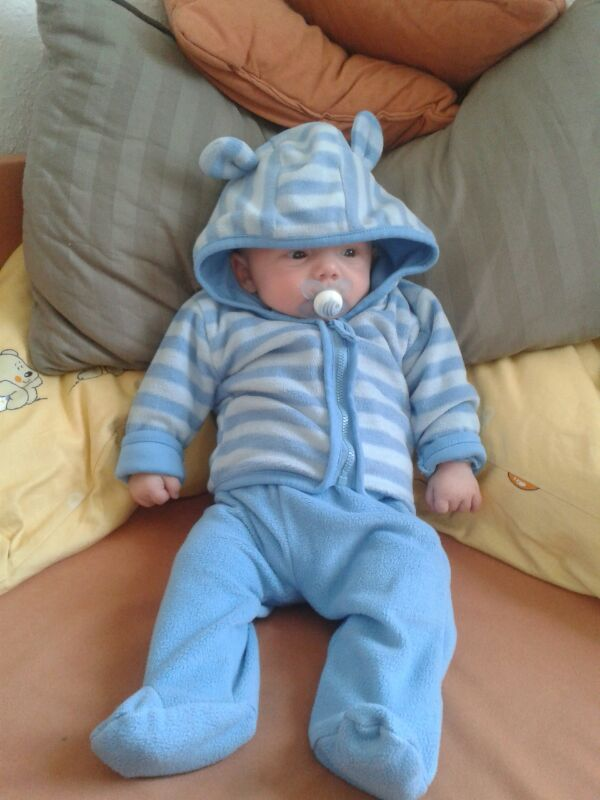
Baby blue newborn male clothing

In Western culture, the color baby blue is often associated with baby boys (and baby pink for baby girls), particularly in clothing and linen and shoes.

In the late 1960s, philosopher Alan Watts, who lived in Sausalito, a suburb of San Francisco, suggested that police cars be painted baby blue and white instead of black and white. This proposal was implemented in San Francisco in the late 1970s, until the late 1980s. Watts also suggested that the police should wear baby blue uniforms because, he asserted, this would make them less likely to commit acts of police brutality than if they were wearing the usual dark blue uniforms. This proposal was never implemented.

Baby blue is an official color used in the flag of Argentina.

== See also ==
- Light sky blue – a similar shade, named in the X11/html color family
- Baby pink
- List of colors
- Pinkstinks
