= Perception (journal) =

- Discipline: Psychology, Perception
- Language: English

Publication details
- History: 1972-present
- Publisher: SAGE Publications, formerly Pion (UK)
- Impact factor: 1.087 (2016)

Standard abbreviations
- ISO 4: Perception

Indexing
- ISSN: 0301-0066 (print); 1468-4233 (web)

Links
- Journal homepage

Perception is a peer-reviewed scientific journal specialising in the psychology of vision and perception. Founded by Richard Gregory, it is available in print form and online. It publishes primary research from any discipline within the sensory sciences. The journal is indexed in PubMed.
