= Elisabeth Robinson Scovil =

Canadian nurse and writer

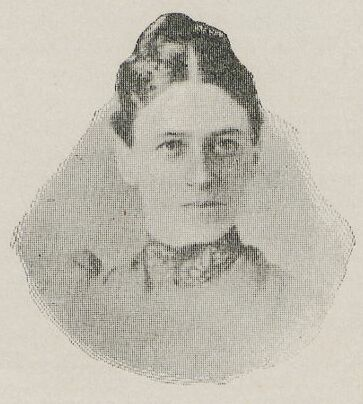
- Elizabeth Robinson Scovil, as she appeared in the 1899 Portrait album of who's who at the International Congress of Women.
- Born: April 30, 1849; Saint John, New Brunswick
- Died: November 20, 1934 (aged 85)
- Occupations: nurse and writer

Elisabeth Robinson Scovil (commonly written Elizabeth Robinson Scovil, 1849 – 1934) was a nurse born in New Brunswick. She was among the first to graduate from the Boston Training School for Nurses (now, Massachusetts General Hospital School of Nursing). She headed the Infirmary at St. Paul's School in New Hampshire and wrote for the Ladies' Home Journal.

== Biography ==
Elisabeth Robinson Scovil was born on 30 April 1849, in Saint John, New Brunswick. She was the daughter of Samuel James Scovil, a lawyer descended from a line of notable clergy, and Mary Eliza Robinson, great-grandniece of the politician John Robinson.

At 29, she was enrolled in a 2-year course at the Boston Training School for Nurses at Massachusetts General Hospital. During her studies, she began contributing articles for publications including Scribner's Monthly and the Christian Union. An article in The Youth's Companion, after she graduated, about learning to become a nurse, apparently led to over 1,000 applications to the school, winning her thanks from its board of directors.

Scoville became the superintendent of the Infirmary at St. Paul's School in Concord, New Hampshire, in 1880. Eventually she became the superintendent and instructor at Newport Hospital in Newport, Rhode Island, which was connected with the naval torpedo station there.

From 1888, for 12 years she was an associate-editor of the Ladies' Home Journal, she was an assistant editor of the American Journal of Nursing, and was on the staff of the Canadian Nurse.

Scoville went back to Canada in 1903 to take care of her nieces and nephews after the death of her sister-in-law. She died in England on November 20, 1934, at the age of 85.

== Works ==
Between the early 1890s and 1930s Scovil wrote 23 books on a wide range of subjects, including family life, religion, poetry and health, with her works on the latter topic being best sellers.

Some works by Elisabeth Robinson Scovil include:

- In the sick room: what to do, how to do, and when to do for the sick: the art of nursing. Springfield, Mass. 1888.
- A baby's requirements. Philadelphia. 1892.
- The care of children. 1894.
- Hymns of praise and gladness. 1896.
- Preparation for motherhood. 1896.
- Evening comfort. 1898.

Preparation for motherhood is notable as one of the first generally accessible books to discuss Conception, pregnancy and childbirth. In its introduction Scoville wrote:

"If mothers talked frankly yet modestly with their daughters, first informing themselves and then teaching their children some of the great central facts of life, there would be less unhappiness, suffering and ill health."

— Elisabeth Scovil, Preparation for motherhood (1896)

The impact of this book can be found in an obituary: "This book, and The Care of Children, so changed women's lives that when [Scovil] traveled by train to British Columbia to attend a meeting of the National Council of Women, groups of women gathered on station platforms, calling her name so they could thank her for the gift of knowledge."
