= Pink and Blue: Telling the Boys from the Girls in America =

2012 book by Jo B. Paoletti

First edition

Pink and Blue: Telling the Boys from the Girls in America is a 2012 book by Jo B. Paoletti, published by Indiana University Press.

The book is about the shift into gendered clothing for very young children in the beginning of the 20th Century. The beginning of the book's survey is 1885. It also includes the 1960s-circa 1985 trend of gender neutral clothing and the gendered clothing that came after it. The endpoint of its coverage was the year prior to publication.

The book has 139 pages. Rob Shoreman of Miami University characterized that number as making the book "slim".

== Background ==
The author joined the faculty of the University of Maryland in 1976 (department of Textiles and Consumer Economics) and retired from the department of American Studies in 2017.

The author consulted primary sources (extant garments, papers dolls, retail catalogs, and baby records) in addition to secondary sources in multiple fields.

== Reception ==
Shoreman stated that the book's writing style was cogent and that the work is "an illuminating read in its own right."

Tanfer Emin Tunc of Hacettepe University wrote that due to the complexity of the task of forming a "cohesive narrative" about how clothing for young children evolved, she stated the book's attempt was "The strength, and simultaneously the main weakness."
