= Creatable World =

Gender-neutral fashion doll line by Mattel

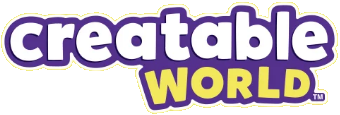
- A Creatable World doll alongside a wig for different hair length
- Type: Gender-neutral dolls
- Company: Mattel
- Country: United States
- Availability: 2019–present
- Official website

Creatable World is the first line of gender-neutral dolls produced by Mattel. Creatable World dolls differ in design from other dolls produced by Mattel. The design of the doll is unique and is noticeably different from both Barbie and Ken; there are no curves or broad shoulders present on the dolls. The doll does not have breasts like Barbie does and has other features that do not display an obvious gender. The dolls are designed to be versatile: with wigs to change hairstyles and a variety of clothing options. Research and design for the doll line's development took 18 months. Mattel tested the product with focus groups that included children with a variety of gender identities.

== Overview ==
The dolls are sold in kits, and 6 different kits are currently part of the doll line. The kits offer several customization options, including different hairstyles, clothes and accessories that are intended to offer a variety of both feminine- and masculine-presenting play options. The dolls are designed to be versatile: with wigs to change hairstyles, and a variety of clothing options. The packaging obscures the dolls themselves and instead focuses on their possible variations.

== Reception ==
A 2017 survey conducted by the Pew Research Center found that approximately 76% of Americans supported girls pursuing interests perceived as masculine and approximately 64% of Americans supported boys pursuing interests perceived as feminine. There were differences based in responses from different political affiliations: approximately 84% of Democrats supported girls pursuing masculine interests compared to approximately 66% of Republicans. Responses also varied by gender: approximately 58% of Republican women supported boys pursuing feminine interests, in contrast to approximately 38% of Republican men. A 2019 consumer survey of approximately 700 adult shoppers indicated that 25% expressed a positive view of gender-neutral toys and that 5% were interested in purchasing dolls from the Creatable World line as a holiday gift.

Creatable World was praised by Jess Day, a campaigner for Let Toys Be Toys, who hoped that more toy manufacturers would follow suit in the future and avoid gender stereotypes. Day stated that "Toy companies have been quite slow to take on board that the world has changed. Most parents don't really want to see their children's interests limited." Madeline Schulz, writing for the Washington Examiner, criticized the doll line. Schulz argued that the doll line went beyond Mattel "trying to break down stereotypes" and was "woke capitalism", since the dolls were "more than three times the price of the average Barbie doll." Schulz also argued that Mattel was alienating a substantial portion of their target customers.

According to Eliana Dockerman, a staff writer for Time, some marketing materials included an "overt nod to trans and nonbinary identities" by including a group of children who used various pronouns and the usage of the slogan "A doll line designed to keep labels out and invite everyone in". Alex Meyers, writing for Slate, criticized the doll line for this:

On a basic level, the doll falls far short of actually embodying or even representing a nonbinary identity. “Gender-neutral,” the term Mattel uses in its marketing of the doll, is not, in fact, a term that many—any?—people use to describe themselves. They use “gender-fluid,” or genderqueer, or nonbinary, or nonconforming. These dolls reinforce the idea that gender is “playful” and easy to switch around, accusations often leveled at trans youths.

Creatable World was recognized by the Project Management Institute in its list of the most influential projects of 2020. It was also a finalist for the Toy of the Year in the doll category.

== See also ==
- Everyone Is Awesome
- Gender polarization
- Gender role
- Gender variance
- Let Books Be Books
- List of toys
- Pinkstinks
- Waldorf doll
