= Gender neutrality =

Avoiding distinguishing based on gender

Unisex icon

Gender neutrality (adjective form: gender-neutral), also known as gender-neutralism or the gender neutrality movement, is the idea that policies, language, and other social institutions (social structures and gender roles) should avoid distinguishing roles according to people's sex or gender. This is to avoid discrimination arising from the impression that there are social roles for which one gender is more suited than another. The disparity in gender equality throughout history has had a significant impact on many aspects of society, including marketing, toys, education and parenting techniques. To increase gender neutrality in recent years, there has been a societal emphasis on using inclusive language and advocating for equality.

== In policy ==
Proponents of gender neutrality may support public policies designed to eliminate gender distinctions. Gender neutrality in the law has changed the nature of custody disputes, making it more likely that men will be awarded custody of their children in the event of a divorce.

The legal definition of gender has been a controversial topic to transgender people; in some countries, to be legally defined as a new gender, people must first undergo sex reassignment surgery resulting in sterilization.

California joined Oregon in its effort to recognize gender neutrality. On 15 October 2017, California governor Jerry Brown signed new legislation into law that allows persons the option to select gender-neutral on state identification cards. On 9 October 2021, governor Gavin Newsom signed California Assembly Bill 1084 requiring many department stores in California to maintain a gender neutral children's section.

Legal frameworks for determining parentage have traditionally relied on gendered concepts, but these approaches face challenges as family structures diversify. Following the legalization of same-sex marriage in the United States, courts and legislatures have had to reconsider how parentage rules apply when they cannot rely on traditional gender-based assumptions. This has prompted exploration of alternative bases for legal parentage, including intention, function, and agreement rather than solely biology or marriage.

Studies show that workplace leave policies using terms like "maternity leave" and "paternity leave" create problems for parents who don't fit traditional gender categories. Research by Holroyd and Cull found that many people feel forced to accept incorrect gender labels just to access their rightful benefits. According to their research, it makes more sense to just use phrases like "parental leave" or "family leave" for everyone. While businesses may continue to collect volunteer gender data to address any prejudice, this simple move helps all parents feel valued. The strategy broadens the scope of policies while continuing to work for equitable treatment for all parents.

== Gender blindness ==
Gender blindness is the practice of not distinguishing people by gender.

Someone who is gender blind does not necessarily side with ideas of movements found within gender-related biases, though these accounts are debatable.

For example, gender blindness can take place while hiring new candidates for a job position. The employer more so focuses on the resume and cover letter rather than focusing on their gender. This reduces gender-bias, meaning there is a preference of one gender to be favored over the other in certain topics and roles.

== Gender-neutral language ==
Gender-neutral language, gender-inclusive language, inclusive language or gender neutrality is a form of linguistic prescriptivism that aims to eliminate (or neutralize) reference to gender in terms that describe people. This can involve discouragement of the use of gender-specific job titles, such as policeman/policewoman, fireman, stewardess, chairman, and, arguably, in favor of corresponding gender-neutral terms such as police officer, firefighter, flight attendant and chairperson (or chair). Other gender-specific terms, such as actor and actress, may be replaced by the originally male term (actor used for either gender).

The language used in standardized tests can influence gender-based performance gaps. A study of Israel's college entrance examinations showed that using more inclusive language forms reduced the gender performance gap in quantitative sections by approximately one-fifth. It is possible that conventional gendered language may cause disadvantages through stereotypes, as the researchers found that this linguistic adjustment particularly boosted women's performance without having a negative impact on men's findings.

The practice of gender-neutral language is highly encouraged among law students and the Supreme Court of the United States. However, research has shown that, as of 2010, only one judge on the Supreme Court consistently uses gender-neutral language.

Research suggests that using the singular "they" as a gender-neutral pronoun may be processed efficiently by readers. Studies examining reading times found that when referring to nonspecific individuals, sentences with singular "they" were processed similarly to those using gender-matched pronouns (he/she) and more efficiently than sentences with gender-mismatched pronouns. When referring to particular people whose gender is known, however, the cognitive processing is different; gender-matching pronouns are processed more quickly.

The pronouns he or she may be replaced with they when the gender of the person referred to is unknown. In addition, those who do not identify as either female or male may use a gender-neutral pronoun to refer to themselves or have others refer to them.

A traditional view encouraged the pronoun he to be considered neutral up until the 60s–70s, when feminist objections occurred, so people began to use "he or she" pronouns. Today, using "he or she" can be considered making assumptions about someone's gender. The pronoun they wouldn't necessarily refer to a male or female.

In 2012 a gender-neutral pronoun hen was proposed in Sweden, and in 2014 it was announced that this word would be included in the following edition of the Swedish Academy Glossary. Swedish thus became the first language to have a gender-neutral pronoun added by an authoritative institution. Hen can be used to describe anyone regardless of their sex or gender identification. Gender-neutral pronouns that have been proposed in the United States have not had widespread use outside of LGBTQ communities.

LGBTQ activists have suggested that the pronouns "he/she and his/her linguistically enforce a normative two sex system" where one must fall into the gender binary of either male or female. There is a growing variety of several different gender-neutral pronouns. These may include sie, hir, hirs, and hirself, and also include z or p. LGBTQ activists argue that only changing pronouns to be gender-neutral for people who are "sex/gender" ambiguous creates someone "other" than the norm. A proposed solution to this issue is to move towards the use of inclusive language and gender-neutral pronouns for everyone, even when the sex of a person is known, in an effort to remove the alleged subconscious effects of language in reinforcing gender and gender stereotypes.

"Gender-neutral language" should not be confused with "genderless language", which refers to a language that does not have grammatical gender.

== Relationship to feminism and masculism ==
Gender neutrality emphasizes the equal treatment of men and women and people of any other gender legally with no discrimination whatsoever. This goal is, in principle, shared with both feminists and masculists. However, in gender neutralism, the emphasis is on transcending the perspective of gender altogether rather than focusing on the rights of specific genders.

== Relationship to transhumanism ==
Gender neutrality or "gender transcendence" is part of the transhumanist concept of postgenderism, which is defined as the movement to erode the cultural, biological, psychological, and social role of gender within society.

Advocates of postgenderism argue that the presence of gender roles, social stratification, and cogno-physical disparities and differences are generally to the detriment of individuals and society. Given the radical potential for advanced assistive reproductive options, postgenderists believe that sex for reproductive purposes will either become obsolete, or that all post-gendered humans will have the ability, if they so choose, to both carry a pregnancy to term and impregnate someone, which, postgenderists believe, would have the effect of eliminating the need for definite genders in such a society.

From a transhumanist perspective, a shift in gender neutrality is seen as a direct result of the movement of postgenderism. Along with gender fluidity and postgenderism, gender neutrality would be a contributor if a movement of transhumanism were to occur. Given that an individual's phenotype serves as the primary basis for gender classification, transhumanism would erode the binary division of gender, allowing for gender neutrality within future societies.

== Impact ==
=== In marketing ===
Marketing is often focused on targeting specific demographics and creating products focused on specific genders. Public views on gender-specific marketing have gained media attention in recent years. For example, a protest against a Bic pen "Bic for her" that was targeted towards women by the posting of thousands of fake reviews of the pen mocking its female-specific advertising.

==== Children's toys ====
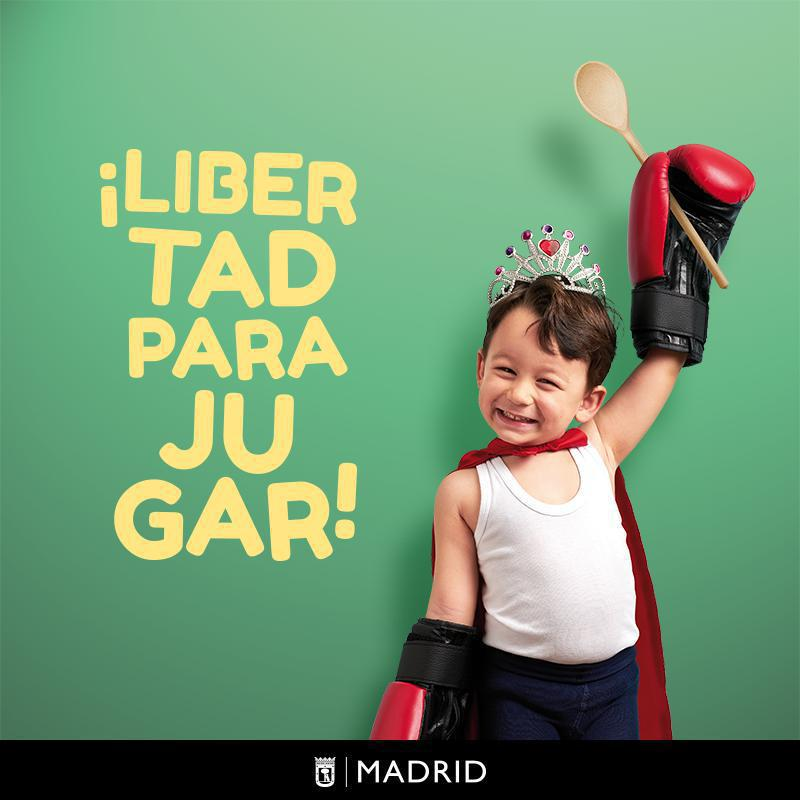
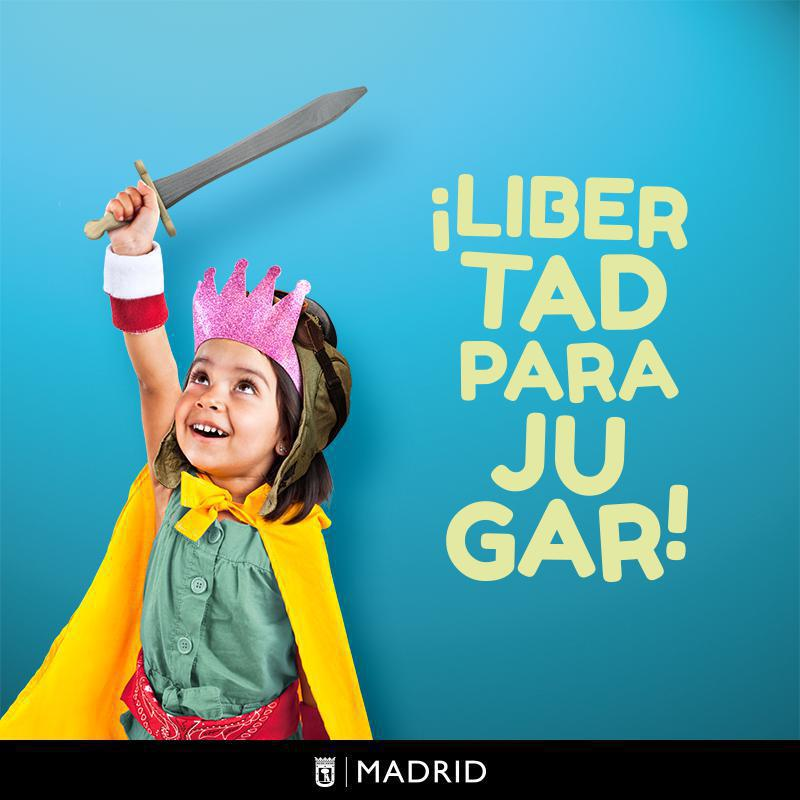
¡Libertad para jugar! (Freedom to play!). Gender neutrality in children's toys campaign, by the Madrid City Council

In the marketing of children's toys, gender-specific marketing has been very prevalent. According to a study conducted in 2012, "children learn about the toys seen as appropriate for their gender not only from adults and children but also through the media, which serves as an important source of socialization and gender socialization." Color palettes and types of toys are gendered characteristics of the toys marketed to either boys or girls. The results of the study mentioned above, showed that "toys that were pastel colored were much more likely to be marketed as toys for 'only girls', while bold colored toys were much more likely to be marketed as toys for 'boys only'" and also found that blue was a more gender-neutral color. Action toys, like cars, weapons, and building toys are marketed toward boys, while toys that have to do with beauty and domestic work are marketed towards girls. According to Lauren Spinner, "Portrayals of boys tend to emphasize masculine gender roles and stereotypically masculine play and toys, whereas portrayals of girls tend to emphasize feminine gender roles and stereotypically feminine play and toys".

An additional study done in 2014 focuses on labeling of toys, "for girls" and "for boys", paired with explicit colors, pink and blue, and gender stereotypes in children. In one study, novel items were presented to children, painted different colors and labeled differently. A nutcracker was presented to the children as blue and labeled "for boys" in once instance, but to other children it was pink and labeled "for girls". The results of the studies found labeling profoundly affected the children's liking towards toys, and the other study showed that girls are more affected than boys in terms of labeling.

The "color pink did seem to give girls permission to explore masculine toys. This indicates that pink may signify that it is allowable for girls to show interest in counter-stereotypic toys and activities". This gender specific marketing/labeling exposes children to gender roles and that color can be an indicator of gender. Children "show less involvement with toys stereotypically associated with the opposite sex, and they reject such toys more than ones stereotypically associated with their own sex or neutral ones". Toys are a medium for children to form gender stereotypes. Some toys, like stuffed animals, have proven to be gender-neutral and are usually marketed to both boys and girls.

Parents also play a large role in building their children's gender socialization, as they are the ones buying the toys for their children. The popularity of making toy advertising gender neutral has been increasing through media such as ads showing boys playing with baby dolls (a toy that has commonly been marketed only towards girls in the past). At a young age for both boys and girls start to identify themselves by their gender role and are limited to what they can or can't do. Not just that, but the environment around young boys and girls also influences their behavior.

In 2019, Mattel, a company with a long brand history within gender typing (e.g. Barbie), introduced its Creatable World doll line, a new toy that is the "world's first gender neutral doll".

==== Fashion ====
In the marketing of fashion lines, some designers are beginning to design gender-neutral clothing, that is not labeled as either "men's" or "women's". In today's society gender neutrality is becoming more widely accepted. "Both males and females are now 'allowed' to wear certain clothing items once thought inappropriate for their sex". Women have more freedom because them wearing more masculine clothing, like suits, is generally accepted, but men wearing feminine clothing, like dresses, is less approved. This aspect of gender neutral clothing says "that the world according to (ruling-class) men [is] the only viable one" because most gender neutral clothing looks like typical male clothing.

=== In education ===
Nicolaigarden and Egalia, two preschools in Sweden, have replaced the terms "girl" and "boy" with the gender neutral pronoun "hen", granting students the ability to challenge or cross gender boundaries. In a study done in 2016 that measured teachers' facilitation of gender-typed and gender-neutral activities during free play, it was concluded that teachers facilitated masculine activities at higher rates than feminine. It is suggested by the study that, "Informing teachers about this trend may prompt teachers to reflect on their own teaching practices and serve as a catalyst for the promotion of teaching practices that create classroom environments in which boys and girls receive support for engagement with a variety of classroom activities." Other suggestions and pursuits to broaden the mentality behind gender neutrality in schools include

- allowing for gender-neutral prom and homecoming attendance and courts to accommodate same-sex-coupled and transgender participants
- designating gender-neutral bathrooms and on-campus housing
- establishing gender-neutral and co-ed fraternal student organizations
- not separating toys in gender-specific areas
- not having gender-specific sports in physical education lessons

==== Dress code ====
The abolishment of certain dress codes has been conserved among institutions depending on the limitations imposed on students and their comfort in such attire. For transgender students, strict dress codes may complicate their path towards confirming their gender identity, a cost which can affect these individuals well throughout their life. Ways in which compliance with attire in institutions can cause reverberations in other areas of life are factors such as lowered academic performance, higher dropout rates, and increased disciplinary action. As of 2017, 150 primary schools in the United Kingdom have introduced gender neutral uniforms and students feel more in control of their identity as a result of this policy change.

==== College ====
In 2005, University of California, Riverside became the first public university campus in the US to offer a gender-neutral housing option. A February 2014 Washington Post article noted that nearly 150 US schools now have gender-neutral housing programs. Other institutions such as University of Southern California and Princeton, acknowledge some of the dangers that come as a result to housing options as a member of the LGBTQ community and have also developed separate housing to accommodate such students.

In 2016, La Salle University students voted to have a gender-neutral housing option in their dormitories, which would make La Salle the first Catholic university in the United States to offer gender-neutral living. This student-led vote caused controversy in Catholic circles across the United States, since it is traditional for Catholic school residence halls to be completely separated by gender. La Salle University has since incorporated accommodating housing options for students and has urged other Catholic universities to make changes in housing policies as well.

A growing number of American colleges are adopting chosen name and identity policies. As of June 2022, at least 788 American colleges allow students to use a chosen first name, and at least 242 colleges allow students to designate their personal pronouns.

=== In parenting ===
Jennifer Hockenbery Dragseth describes gender as "the classification of male or female that includes social, psychological, and intellectual characteristics. The theory of gender neutrality claims that biological sex does not inevitably determine social, psychological, and intellectual characteristics." Parental control strategies can be defined as any strategy that a parent uses to alter, change, or influence their child's behavior, thoughts, or feelings. Meta-analysis reveals from Endendijk, "the basis of gender-neutral parenting also known as GNP, does not project a gender onto a child. It allows parents and children to break away from gender binary."

Gender-neutral parenting is allowing children to be exposed to a variety of gender types so children can explore their gender without restriction from society or the gender they were born with. Autonomy-supportive strategies provide the child with an appropriate amount of control, a desired amount of choice, acknowledge the child's perspectives and provide the child with meaningful rationales when the choice is constrained. Even if a child does not display gender-bending behaviors, gender neutral parenting allows them to explore and not be constrained in the gender they were born with. This can be through letting them play with non-stereotypical toys for their gender, allowing them to pick their own clothing, allowing them to act more "feminine" or "masculine", and allowing children to question their gender. In the sociology book Sex Differences in Social Behavior: A Social Role Interpretation, Alice Eagly theorizes that sex differences have been proposed, based on biological factors, early childhood socialization, and other perspectives. This allows children to express themselves without feeling pressure from being extremely masculine or feminine.

==== Attitudes and judgement towards gender-roles and toys ====
Parent attitudes towards the child can influence child behaviors such as in toy selection. For example, parent, offer children toys and other objects that are gender-specific, such as trucks for boys and dolls for girls. A study done in Austria, where 324 parents participated showed that by parents' judgments about the desirability of different types of toys for their children and how the parents' judgment based on gender-typing of toys, gender role attitudes shows that parents rated same-gender-typed and gender-neutral toys as more desirable for their children than cross-gender-typed toys. This indicates that most traditional parents limit their child interests and behaviors than egalitarian parents.

In terms of education, parents' attitudes towards their child gender reflects on their expectation for the child. Because parents are still unwilling to send their daughters to the schools, there is a low participation rate of female education compared to male. Parents tend to treat their sons and daughters differently, preferring their sons over their daughters due to the gender roles society has placed, considering children as helping hands for their parents. For example, sons should provide economic support while daughters are expected to conform to the house. Although sons are still preferred, the attitudes towards neutrality have steadily increased in the past two decades. Feminist economics such as Julie A. Nelson argues that for a nonsexist society, the differences are revalued positively while others such as Patricia Elliot believes gender‐specific categories need to be eliminated to enable a positive society.

Although gender-neutral parenting allows their children to be able to decide how they experience their gender, non-gender neutral parents believe the children are programmed in from birth to play with gender directed toys, and parents had no influence towards their children selecting a gender-stereotyped toy.

Children at a young age start to develop a sense of how everyone starts to dress depending the gender of each individual. For instance, when a girl dresses in a way that contradicts societal norms, she might suffer bullying. According to Kent, Canterbury, states that among children between 3 and 7 years old, "younger girls were more motivated to dress in gender-typed ways than older girls were, and understanding of gender stability (i.e. knowledge that gender remains stable over time) predicted appearance rigidity in both boys and girls".

=== In children's literature ===
Gender neutrality in children's literature refers to the idea that publishers, writers and illustrators should avoid marketing towards children through the basis of their sex or gender, and should instead focus on expanding content rather than reinforcing social and gender roles. Gender roles and stereotypes permeate our culture and are established through a variety of means such as visual culture or daily interactions with family and peers. Gender neutrality in children's marketing is a growing movement among parents, children and publishers. Although there are many homes to gender stereotypes, the books that children are encountering have both psychological and social uses during a time when children are constantly constructing ideas from information around them and assimilating new knowledge with previous knowledge. Organizations such as Let Toys Be Toys, Let Books Be Books and Pinkstinks have been gaining publicity for their work in favour of gender neutrality within children's literature and toys.

==== Representations of gender within picture books ====
Studies at Provider-Parent Partnerships have shown that children begin forming their sense of gender identity at 2–3 years old and begin 'Gender typing' at ages 3–4. In a study surrounding Gender Perception in Adults, Dr. Kyle Pruett reported: "A defining moment came in gender difference research when a group of male babies were dressed in pink, and then handed to adults who were told they were girls. The adults responded with language and handling styles shown to be classically female-stereotypic: 'adorable, cuddly, sweet, cute,' etc. Female babies in blue were called 'slugger, tough, strong, stubborn,' etc. This is how we simply wind up reinforcing gender-stereotypic behaviors, rather than fostering individual growth and development."

The concept of a child developing their sense of self in formative years has been a topic of discussion among cultural theorists as well as in children's literature criticism. In The Pleasures of Children's Literature, Shulamith Shahar states, "Child raising practices and educational methods as well as parent-child relation are determined not solely by biological laws but are also culturally constructed".

Theorists such as Jacques Lacan and Judith Butler have contributed to this notion of the formation of an individual's subjectivity and sense of self. Lacan's concept of the mirror stage has contributed to modern understanding of subjectivity and has since been applied to Children's Literature Criticism and child development. The Mirror Stage refers to the process in which an infant recognizes itself in the mirror for the first time and, "the transformation that takes place in the subject when he assumes an image". As Hamida Bosmajian has stated in Understanding Children's Literature, "The literary text, then, is an image of the unconscious structured like a language." Bosmajian proceeds to write, "When the [Mirror Stage] is given utterance in the reader-interpreter's language, [the meaning] is deferred."

Judith Butler's notion of gender performativity also forms correlations to gender-specific children's literature through analyzing the ways characters perform their gender and has been taken up in Children's literature criticism. Butler has defined gender performativity stating: "the production actually happens through a certain kind of repetition and recitation". Butler also relays that, "Performativity is the discursive mode by which ontological effects are installed." Although Butler's subject is the adult subject the concept of repetition transcends to themes of childhood as well. Both Butler and Lacan consider repetition as being an underlying factor in forming one's identity which can then be applied to children's literature through the act of children rereading books multiple times.

==== Studies in representation in children's literature ====
Gender imbalances have continued to appear in children's literature through the lack of diverse representations. In the 2011 issue of Gender & Society, the study "Gender in Twentieth-Century Children's Books" discovered large disparities. Through looking at almost 6,000 children's books published between 1900 and 2000, the study, led by Janice McCabe, a professor of sociology at Florida State University, found that males are central characters in 57% of children's books published each year, with just 31% having female central characters. Male animals are central characters in 23% of books per year, the study found, while female animals star in only 7.5%. In putting forth these narrow representations of characters, it becomes difficult for a child to identify themselves within gender binaries and roles. In an earlier study in 1971, out of fifty-eight books, twenty-five had a picture of a woman somewhere in them, yet only four did not having a woman (or animal representing a woman) wearing an apron. Many parents read their own childhood favourites to their children, through an endearing plot, or through beautiful illustrations. Although the adult may recognize that the stereotypes may be outdated, the children may lack that criticality in reading these stories. Furthering this portrayal of gender in children's books the ways in which each gender is portrayed is very different. Female characters are much more likely to take on passive and supportive roles whereas male characters fulfill a self-sufficient, strong and active role. This discriminatory portrayal takes place in many children's books and runs the risk of leading children toward a misrepresented and misguided realization of their true potential in their expanding world.

Not only are these inequalities present within the books, but gender disparities also exist among those creating children's books. In the 2013 Vida: Women in Literary Arts count, male authors and illustrators drastically outnumbered those who were female (64:21).

==== In children's literature in the media ====
In March 2014, the British organization, Let Toys Be Toys, expanded to include a children's book specific category, Let Books Be Books. This expansion specifically addressed gender specific titles on books such as The Beautiful Girl's Colouring Book and The Brilliant Boys Colouring Book and the limitations in which these titles impose upon children. As Katy Guest stated in an article for the Independent in March 2014, after Let Books Be Books launched, "What we are doing by pigeon-holing children is badly letting them down. And books, above all things, should be available to any child who is interested in them." As the organization Let Toys Be Toys states, "Just like labeling toys 'for girls' or 'for boys' these books send out very limiting messages to children about what kinds of things are appropriate for girls or for boys."

The organization quickly gained momentum and almost immediately acquired over 3000 signatures for their petition causing publishers Parragon and Usborne to lend their support and stop publishing gender specific children's books. In November 2014, publishers of Peter and Jane Books, Ladybird Books agreed to make titles gender neutral stating: "At Ladybird, we certainly don't want to be seen to be limiting children in any way."

==== Controversy ====
Publishers such as Igloo Books and Buster Books continue to publish gender-specific children's books. In an interview in March 2014 Buster Editor Michael O'Mara stated: "The proof is in the pudding. Our two best children books ever are The Boys' Book and The Girls' Book. The boys' one included things like how to make a bow and arrow and how to play certain sports and you'd get things about style and how to look cool in the girls' book. 2,000 people signed this petition [in the first day], but we sold 500,000 copies of The Girls' Book. These statistics tell me I'm going in the right direction."

In a letter in response to this interview Let Books Be Books expressed the following concerns to Michael O'Mara: "We have been contacted by many parents, teachers and supporters who have serious concerns about several of the titles currently on your website and being marketed in shops across the UK. They believe, as we do, that labeling books by gender narrows children's choices and imaginations by telling them what they 'should' be reading, instead of letting them choose books that interest them."

==== List of gender-neutral children's literature ====
Although there are many examples of gender-neutral children's literature, the following list contains a few notable examples.

- John Dough and the Cherub – L. Frank Baum
- Black Dog – Levi Pinfold
- How To – Julie Morstad
- How to Heal a Broken Wing – Bob Graham
- Little You – Richard Van Camp & ill. Julie Flett
- One Night, Far From Here – Julia Wauters
- Once Upon a Northern Night – Jean E. Pendziwol & ill. Isabelle Arsenault
- Ruby's School Walk – Kathryn White & ill. Miriam Latimer
- Samuel's Baby – Mark Elkin & ill. Amy Wummer
- Spork – Kyo Maclear & ill. Isabelle Arsenault
- Super Daisy – Kes Gray & ill. Nick Sharratt
- The Big Brother – Stephanie Dagg & ill. Alan Clarke
- The King & the Seed – Eric Maddern & ill. Paul Hess
- The Sunflower Sword – Mark Sperring & ill. Mirian Latimer
- We Go Together!: A Curious Selection of Affectionate Verse – Calef Brown
- Wild – Emily Hughes
- Call Me Tree – Maya Christina González

== Activism ==
In 2006 the National Student Genderblind Campaign was created as a collaborative grassroots organization intended to educate college students, administrators, and others throughout the United States. The NSGC advocates for the implementation of gender-inclusive dorm room and bathroom options.

Twin siblings Emma Moore and Abi Moore founded a campaign, Pinkstinks, in London in May 2008 to raise awareness of the damage caused by gender stereotyping of children. Pinkstinks claims that the marketing of gender-specific products to young children encourages girls to limit their ambitions later in life.

In a 2014 campaign, the United States–based grassroots group Play Unlimited announced the month-long observance of No Gender December.

In 2016, Canada came out with the "No Big Deal" campaign which is a "positive affirming response to the recent conflict around transgender peoples' pronouns." This campaign encourages people to ask what pronouns people identify as, instead of just assuming based on people's looks. It also tries to make different pronouns easier for people to understand and grasp.

== Gender-neutral lawsuits ==
=== Jones v. Bon Appetit Management Company et al ===
In February 2014, former catering worker Valeria Jones sued employer Bon Appetit Management Co. in Oregon for US$518,000 after co-workers repeatedly referred to Jones as female. Jones did not identify as either male or female and when applying to work at Bon Appetit, purposely never filled out the male or female identification question. They repeatedly informed co-workers that they did not want to be identified using male or female gender pronouns and asked managers to address the employees as a group and educate the others about gender identity. Jones's suit states that the complaint to human resources was never resolved and the managers did not follow through per their requests, prompting their resignation.

=== Zzyym v. Tillerson ===
In September 2014, Dana Zzyym, an American U.S. Naval veteran, tried to apply for a passport. Instead of labeling their gender as male or female on the application form, they "wrote 'intersex' below the 'sex' category" and "requested 'X' as an acceptable marker." They presented a birth certificate which labels Zzyym as neither male nor female. Zzyym was born with ambiguous genitalia and identifies as intersex. The State Department declined Zzyym's application. Zzyym sued the State Department, "saying the federal government violated the Constitution's guarantees of due process rights and discriminated against Zzyym based on gender." In November 2016, the court issued the ruling in favor of Zzyym. But as of October 2017, the case has been reopened due to the State Department's continued refusal of a gender marker that is neither male nor female on its passport applications.

=== Elisa Rae Shupe ===
On 27 April 2016, Elisa Rae Shupe filed a petition in Multnomah County, Oregon, to no longer be designated male or female. Shupe, a retired United States Army sergeant, was born with male anatomy and lived for a time as a transgender woman. She later began to self-identify as non-binary. The Oregon state statutes had been changed in 2013 to no longer require proof of medical transition before a change in legal gender status. The statutes did not specify whether the new status had to be a binary one. Two of Shupe's doctors wrote letters for her stating that she was neither male nor female. On 10 June, Judge Amy Holmes Hehn granted Shupe's petition. The ruling was a significant advance toward government recognition of non-binary individuals. In 2019, Shupe issued a statement explaining that she now disagreed with the concept of gender identity and was returning to living as a man. However, in 2022 she published a declaration that she was a trans woman, cutting ties with gender-critical feminists and conversion therapists. Shupe also changed her name to Elisa Rae Shupe.

== Criticism ==
Much as with similar approaches to dealing with racism and ethnicity, not recognising and taking account of participants' sex can be harmful. It posits that it functions in a post-sexism society where women are no longer treated differently than men on the basis of their sex. Meanwhile, gendered treatment prevails all over the world. Of a study of organisations which offered women-only services, 23% said that their reason was based on women's inequality and the desire to address that imbalance; 20% that women-only spaces promote female development and empowerment; 18% that they were providing a service not being met by unisex services and which focused on the specific needs of women.

Solely using "he" and "his" as gender-neutral language can lead to a lack of representation or acknowledgment of certain identities. When pronouns such as "he" or "his" are used to refer to gender-neutral persons, there is a subconscious "sex bias" towards males over females, despite the subject being gender neutral. In sports, a 1993 study concluded that more gender references are made to women's versus men's sports, distinguishing female sports as "other". However, the same study pointed out that having a gender-neutral sports environment could lead to a near complete lack of acknowledgement of women's sports/teams.

The legal test of the "reasonable person" has been criticized for being genderblind in some areas of the law, particularly sexual harassment. In the American case of Ellison v. Brady, 924 F.2d 872 (1991), the court held that "a sex-blind reasonable person standard tends to be male-based and tends to systematically ignore the experiences of women". In The Hidden Gender of Law, Regina Graycar and Jenny Morgan argued that gender-neutral rape statutes can imply that men and women are perpetrators and victims of sexual violence at similar rates, which is not accurate.

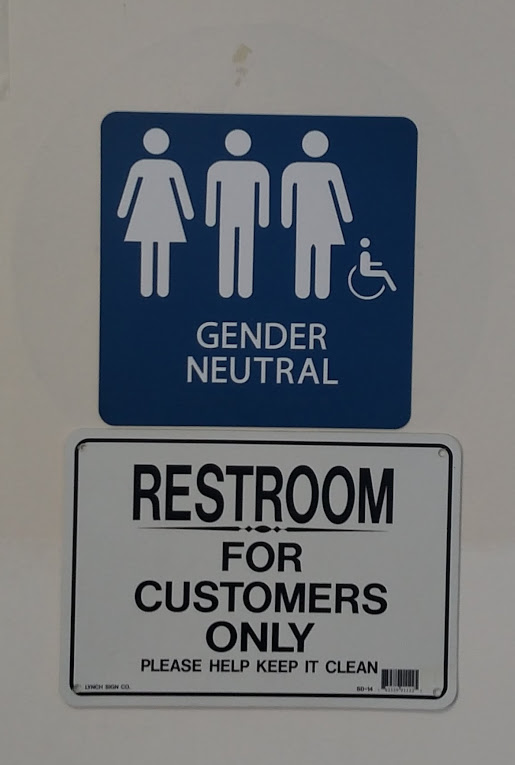
Gender neutral bathroom signage, United States, 2017

Studies indicate a broad support for single-sex service options to remain available. Of 1000 women polled by the Women's Resource Centre, 97% stated that women should have the option of accessing female-only services if they were victims of sexual assault. 57% indicated that they would choose a women-only gym over a mixed gym. Single-sex services can have a benefit in providing greater comfort and engaging participants who would otherwise not get involved. The ridding of all sex-separated restrooms could forfeit the feelings of having a safe bathroom space for some people by replacing them with restrooms for all genders/identities.

Gender-neutral laws have had unintended consequences. The Family and Medical Leave Act (FMLA) of 1993 entitles certain employees a 12-week unpaid leave from work without a risk of job loss and applies to all genders. The employees must qualify for this leave by having been employed for over 12 months and be applying for leave due to a "serious health condition", pregnancy, or adoption. Despite FMLA's gender-neutral language, there are concerns about the law reinforcing gender disparity involving childcare between males and females; since FMLA remains gender neutral, it does not recognize the burden of females during pregnancy that males do not experience. Women with children in the workplace are not given as much attention or resources as is needed for their female-specific, personal/at-home issues, reinforcing the gender disparity despite the law's need to be gender neutral.

== See also ==
- Androgyny
- Epicenity
- Gender binary
- Gender-blind
- Gender equality
- Gender-specific and gender-neutral pronouns
- Non-binary
- Pansexuality
- Political correctness
- Sex and gender distinction
- Transgender
- Unisex
- Unisex public toilet
