= Guildford High School =

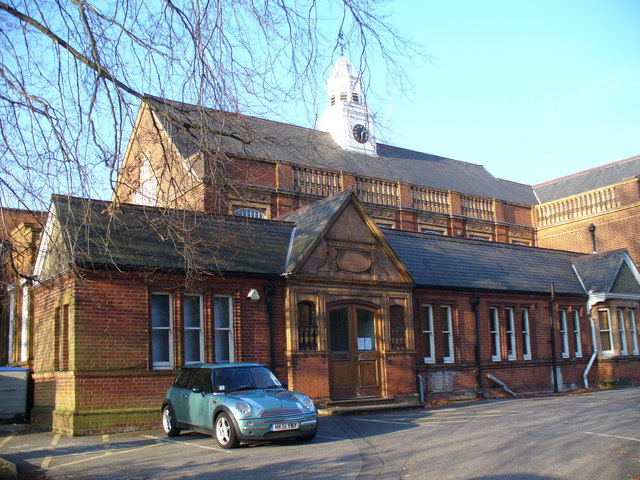

Location
- London Road; Guildford, Surrey, GU1 1SJ; England
- Coordinates: 51°14′30″N 0°33′50″W

Information
- Type: Private day school
- Motto: As one that serveth
- Religious affiliation: Church of England
- Established: 1888
- Local authority: Surrey
- Department for Education URN: 125342 Tables
- Head: Karen Laurie
- Gender: Girls
- Age: 4 to 18
- Enrolment: 985 (2011)
- Affiliation: United Church Schools Trust
- Website: www.guildfordhigh.co.uk

Guildford High School is a private day school for girls that was founded in 1888. Approximately 1,000 girls between ages 4 to 18 are attending the school from Guildford and its surrounding towns and villages. The school comprises a junior school, senior school and sixth form.

== History ==
From the beginning, Guildford High School, founded by the Church Schools Company in 1888, was a progressive school. While some early girls' schools were designed to enhance the knowledge and skills of prospective governesses, Guildford High School sought to provide a feminine counterpart to the reformed public schools for boys. The current site on London Road was completed in 1893 and is still in use. During the post-World War II years, the school underwent rapid expansion. By the 1980s, student numbers had increased to over 600. Today the school has over 980 girls and is still part of the company (now known as the United Church Schools Trust).

== Campus ==
The school possesses a sports centre separate from the main campus. This includes an indoor swimming pool, gym, sports hall, fitness suite and social area. The main campus consists of the Senior school, the sixth form house (Morton House), Nightingale Road House, and the Junior school. Harper House was bought and added to the premises, also enlarging the gardens, in August 2011. The garden of the original Nightingale Road House were converted into a social area when the site was acquired in 2006.

== Notable former pupils ==
- Lorna Arnold, military historian
- Call Me Loop, singer and songwriter
- Pamela Cooper, socialite
- Anne Davies, newsreader
- Ella Hickson, playwright
- Fiona Hodgson, Baroness Hodgson of Abinger, independent sector healthcare assessor
- Celia Imrie, actress
- Emma Sidi, comedian
- Sophie Kauer, cellist and actress
- Clemmie Moodie, journalist
- Misha Nonoo, fashion designer
- Julia Ormond, actress
- Claire Phillips, British portrait artist
- Lucy Prebble, playwright
- Justine Roberts, founder and chief executive of Mumsnet
- Louise Roe, television presenter, fashion journalist and model
- Annabel Tollman, fashion stylist
- Alexandra Wedgwood, architectural historian
- Julia Wilson-Dickson, voice and dialect coach
