= Gender roles in childhood =

Gender roles are culturally influenced stereotypes which create expectations for appropriate behavior for males and females. An understanding of these roles is evident in children as young as age four. Children between 3 and 6 months can form distinctions between male and female faces. By ten months, infants can associate certain objects with females and males, like a hammer with males or scarf with females. Gender roles are influenced by the media, family, the environment, and society. In addition to biological maturation, children develop within a set of gender-specific social and behavioral norms embedded in family structure, natural play patterns, close friendships, and the teeming social jungle of school life. The gender roles encountered in childhood play a large part in shaping an individual's self-concept and influence the way an individual forms relationships later on in life.

== Parental influences and environmental influences ==
When children are first born, they are treated differently according to sex by those around them. How a child is treated will accumulate and begin to influence how a child behaves, reacts, and understands themselves. Parents decorate children's rooms differently to express their idea of what the child's gender will be/ are, boys' rooms have cars, sports equipment, and girls have dolls, multi-colored clothing and lots of pink. The stereotyping of a child begins before they are born and goes on their whole life. Expectations for children's future adult lives, like financial success or future care giving, may lead parents to encourage certain behaviors in children. Girls generally do more housework than boys, and the type of housework assigned to children largely depends on gender. Thus, household dynamics further advance gender role expectations on children.

Also, when both children have encountered difficulty, girls are encouraged to solve problems based on focusing on internal emotion expression and adjustment while boys are encouraged to deal with external entity problems.^{[10]} Children's toy preferences are significantly related to parental sex-typing, such as girls playing with dolls and boys participating in sports. While both fathers and mothers encourage traditional gender roles in their children, fathers tend to encourage these roles more frequently than mothers. By choosing their children's activities, parents are directly influencing their gender role views and preferences onto their children and shaping expectations. For boys whose father discloses emotions more than the others, boys show a similar level of disclosing emotions with girls, and for the parent who is both emotional expressive, their son will view emotions disclosure as a normal practice rather than attributed it as a female way of acting.

In 2001, Claire Hughes found parents of young girls were more likely to have more positive overall affect and stronger discipline. Hughes also found parental warmth to be associated with the development of theory of mind for girls, but not for boys. Hughes suggested this may have to do with a greater tendency for girls to use understanding of mind to seek emotional support, empathize, and cooperate. Children can learn about emotions in a few different ways, by witnessing others' feelings and emotions, having their emotional displays responded to, and lastly through being taught about their feelings and emotions. Not only do girls understand emotions better, but, they are also better than boys at applying cultural standards of emotion expression in everyday life. One example of this is, girls may show a greater tendency than boys to use their increasing understanding of mind to elicit emotional support, or to develop their skills of empathy and cooperation.

According to attachment theory, the early experience and interaction an infant has with his/her caregiver(s) determined whether the infant is securely attached with the caregiver(s), different attachment styles have different influences on one psychological and interpersonal-relationship development. Searle & Meara 1999 found that among college men, people who are securely attached are less likely to suppress their emotions but feel more comfortable expressing it. Besides secure attachment, three other attachment styles are more likely to value success, power, control, and competition that are considered as traditionally masculine traits, in order to make up the lacking sense of security.

Parental disapproval for failing to comply with gender norms and parental approval for successful compliance with these norms can serve to solidify children's understanding of gender roles.

== Patterns of play ==
In early childhood, gender roles become apparent in patterns of play.

Hardy et al. (2009) addresses the differences among preschool boys and girls in their development of fundamental movements. This time period is especially crucial because if a child's fundamental movement skills do not develop properly, then their future development will be drastically impacted. This study took 425 preschool children and asked them to perform specific fundamental movement skills such as locomotor and object control skills. After examining the children performing these movements, the researchers found that female preschoolers are generally better at locomotor movements, while male preschoolers are better at object control. These findings emphasize the need for a superior program in which boys and girls can work together and integrate their skills for a chance at greater development of future skills.

One of the earliest signs of gender differences in play patterns is the appearance of gender-segregated play groups and toy preferences. It's important to highlight the role that age plays in toy preference. In a study the children were given gender-type toys and their findings concluded that for boys at 17 months, 25% of these children used gender labels and by 21 months 68% used these gender labels, while girls tend to use more gender labels by 18 months. Boys tend to be more "rough and tumble" in their play, while girls shy away from this aggressive behavior, leading to the formation of separate play groups. In addition, boys tend to gravitate more towards toys such as trucks while girls tend to gravitate towards dolls, but these preferences are not absolutes. A study by Alexander, Wilcox, and Woods showed that female infants showed more visual interest in a doll over a toy truck while male infants showed more visual interest in a toy truck over a doll, but these differences were more pronounced in the females. This study suggests that preferences for feminine or masculine toys precede any sex differences in the perceptual features of such toys, leading to the assumption that gender-based toy preference is innate.

One of the most compelling theories regarding biologically determined gender differences is the idea that male-preference and female-preference for toys are mediated by inequities in visual processing. The central claim is that males and females are preprogrammed to specialize in certain forms of perception: specifically, perception of motion and perception of form and color, respectively. Alexander (2003) makes a particularly strong case. The author suggests that inherent sex differences based on perceptual categories encourage children to seek out playmates of a similar play style, and ultimately predisposes them for later social and gender roles. Human vision operates based on two anatomically grounded systems: the magnocellular pathway (M-cell) and the parvocellular pathway (P-cell). Both pathways are present in males and females, and M-cells are designed to recognize motion, while P-cells specialize in form and color perception. Some research has suggested that sex-linked differences in M-cell versus P-cell dominance could be the underlying factor leading to differential toy preference in children, potentially validating the stereotype that boys prefer toy cars and balls (objects associated with motion) while girls prefer dolls and stuffed animals (objects characterized by distinct facial characteristics, form, and color).

Beyond hormonal explanations, Alexander (2003) also employs an evolutionary biology perspective to link contemporary toy preference to early selective pressures and the development of visual specialization. Specifically, male M-cell pathway dominance is connected back to motion mediated activities like hunting and the throwing of projectiles. Female P-cell dominance is tied to foraging for plants, a task requiring discrimination between colors and memory of form. Color is particularly important in foraging, as discrimination between colors aids in identifying a ripe piece of fruit from the greenery around it. As it were, the "green-red opponent system" is thought to be X-chromosome linked and phylogenetically more recent, in contrast with the more rudimentary "yellow-blue" system present to the same degree in both sexes. According to the theory, this adaptation has persisted throughout human evolution, and may contribute to contemporary sexual-dimorphism in skill and preference. From this position, Alexander (2003) suggests the designation of pink as a girl color and blue as a boy color might not be completely arbitrary after all.

In a separate study by Gredlin and Bjorklund (2005), it was found that there are sex differences in object manipulation. An experiment was performed by putting a desirable toy in an out-of-reach place, but also giving the child 5 different tools he/she could use to help retrieve this object. The children were put in these conditions and any decision they made was spontaneous and on their own; they were only given a hint after they had failed the task 5 times. The study's results showed that 77% of the boys used one of the tools to reach the toy, while only 31% of the girls used one of the tools. This shows that boys are more likely to participate in object manipulation, and this may be because they spend more time in object-oriented play. The study also found that girls spend more time in social play. Evolution may play a role in this phenomenon; the differences in play styles between boys and girls manifest into adult behavior.

Another study by Alexander and Saenz found that two-year-old girls preferred toys that were typically associated with females over those associated with males, but again, two-year-old boys showed only a small preference for masculine toys over feminine toys. These two studies support the notion that toy preferences, while gender-based, are not a perfect indication of gender identity. Further, a study by Jadva, Hines, and Golombok showed that while male and female infants show more visual attention towards toys specific to their gender, there is no significant sex difference in color or shape preference at a young age, which suggests that, for example, a preference for the color pink in girls stems more from societal norms than from an innate capacity.

Play differences are not concrete, as mentioned, as some play with "other-gendered" toys is quite common. Ruble and Martin showed that there is often cross-gendered play in boys and girls, and this is typical of development. However, it is hypothesized that atypical gendered play patterns, such as a boy who plays almost exclusively with dolls and not typical masculine toys and who prefers to play with girls over boys, are an indication of later homosexuality.

In one study by Eric W. Lindsey and Jacquelyn Mize, context can have a big effect on the types of activities children will partake in. For example, this article outlines that if parents associate certain household tasks with gender unintentionally, the child can get an idea that certain things are "masculine" and "feminine." This is illustrated in the article by an example of a father doing yardwork with his son instead of interior housework; this inherently gives the son the idea that these tasks are more "manly" and is the man's role to do in the house. This can affect gender roles in childhood.

Lobel & Menashri (1993) explore how the rigidity of gender schemas guides behavior. The population of interest consisted of preschool children selected from three different preschools in Tel-Aviv, Israel, and the study focused on the relationship between the children's gender-typed toy choice, their frameworks regarding cross-gender behavior, and their concepts of gender constancy. During the procedure, two feminine and two masculine toys were presented to individual children: a visibly new doll, a tattered, old doll, a shiny new truck, and an old, faded truck. Based on a pretest, the dolls and trucks were clearly recognized as feminine and masculine, as well as attractive and unattractive based on their quality. All children preferred the new toy when presented with a pair of singularly gendered toys. Children were first given a toy preference test, then a gender constancy interview, and then a gender-role norms interview. The results indicate that children with a more flexible view on gender-role norms made fewer gender-typed choices than children with rigid norms. Similarly, for children with more flexible gender norms, attractiveness of the toy proved to be more strongly related to preference than the toy's adherence to a traditional gender-role. This result raises the question: from where does this flexibility in gender behavior come? The authors favor the explanation that parental norms play a large role, but insist that further research must be done. Echoing Serbin et al. (2001), they also assert that a certain level of cognitive ability must be reached in order to demonstrate flexibility in gender roles, otherwise conceptions of fundamental gender constancy could become confused with external objects associated with a traditional gender role.

Besides play patterns being an indication of sexual orientation, the presence of homosexual or heterosexual relationships in the family may in turn influence play patterns in children. It has been suggested that children of same-sex couples are raised differently, resulting in gender roles different from those of heterosexual parents. This viewpoint is validated in a recent study by Goldberg, Kashy, and Smith, which showed that sons of lesbian mothers were less masculine in the way in which they played than those of gay fathers or heterosexual parents. While this study supports one viewpoint on the effects of same-sex parenting, further research is required to validate the long-term consequences of homosexual parenting.

In a 2015 study, it was found that children over the age of two show a stronger preference for the color of an object, as opposed to what the object was. The child was more interested in toys that were gender-traditionally colored, regardless if that toy was a toy typical for their gender. Due to the separation of toys advertised, or colored, for certain genders, it can hinder cognitive and social skills. Boy oriented toys focus on spatial skills, and girl oriented toys focus on social or verbal skills. In solitary play, both girls and boys are more likely to play with gender typical toys, but as found by Signorella (2012), but in group play, gender neutral activities were more likely.

== Friendships and schooling ==
Interaction with peers at school, as well as influence by other socialization agents are incredibly important to the development of children. Studies have found that boys and girls interact with same-sex peers more frequently than with opposite-sex peers. One study found that during early childhood (3- to 5-year-olds), boys affiliate more than girls with a familiar same-sex peer and that boys visited the peer more often than girls did and more boys than girls spent a significant amount of time with the peer. A different study found boys and girls were found to engage in highly similar frequencies of dyadic interaction. However, girls engaged in more extended dyadic interaction and boys in greater number of episodes. A study looked at dyadic friendships, which is believed to be the preferred form of relationship for girls, and found that bonds between males are more durable than those between females. This study reports that beginning as early as 6 years old, external observers report fewer males' than females' same-sex friendships had ended.

By the time children are entering preschool or kindergarten, they have a general understanding of male and female gender, and have internalized some basic schemas regarding the roles and appearances of each. When children at school have the opportunity to do so, they often separate themselves into gender-based groups. For example, division in the lunchroom, hallway, on the playground, etc., demonstrate that same-sex preferences in children dominate the way they think about and associate with school.

== Media ==
From birth, children are able to quickly learn that a great deal of their lives have to deal with masculinity and femininity. For preschool-aged children, and important source of such information is the picture books written specifically for their age group, which are often read to them in their impressionable years. In a study done by Oskamp, Kaufman, and Wolterbeek, it was found that in picture books for the preschool audience, the male characters played more active and explorative roles, and the female characters played the more passive and social roles.

A study done by Powel and Abel analyzed how sex-role stereotypes in television programs such as Teletubbies and Barney are aimed at the preschool audience. In their analysis, Powel and Abel found that gendered messages and behavior is present in preschool television programming, and this was found through eight different themes. Out of the eight themes, five of them, being: leadership, appearance, gendered roles, occupations, and play roles, were significantly gendered.

According to a study examining Hulu's television programming for children, the absence of certain behaviors could be just as problematic to the development of gender roles in children, than what is being depicted on the screen. Furthermore, absences of female characters showing traits of strength, an bravery, and absences of male characters showing traits of affection for example, create negative stereotypes for children as well. This is because children are being told how men and women should/shouldn't behave.

== Children's literature on gender identity ==
Story books are a way for children to learn about the world, a way to learn about gender identity and gender stereotypes. Books are seen as a way for children to understand the roles of men and women in society and reinforce children's idea of appropriate behavior's for men and women. It is important to offer children the option to explore diverse gender roles, by providing tools like books that showcase characters in atypical gender roles. Others have noted that story books that showcase characters doing tasks or in jobs usually assigned to the opposite sex, can impact children's play helping to change a child's view on what behavior's is for men or women, boys or girls. Research suggests that Gender- atypical story books can be a way to expose children to an equitable worldview in classrooms and at home, and it can be a tool to challenge gender stereotypes, books are inexpensive and accessible. Books like I am Jazz by Jessica Herthel, It Feels Good to Be Yourself: A Book About Gender Identity by Therese Thorn, and others discuss what it is like to not feel like you belong in the body you have. Books like Jacob's New Dress by Sarah Hoffman and My Princess Boy by Cherly Kilodavis discuss and showcase stories of boys who do not express typical gender behaviour or enjoy atypical play. And finally books like Not All Princesses Dress in Pink by Jane Yolen and Heidi E.Y. Stemple, and Annie's Plaid Shirt by Stacy B Davids and Rachael Balsaitis showcase girls who do not express typical gender roles and explore atypical behaviour. These stories can help children and adults learn about gender identity and gender stereotypes.

== Children's expression of gender identity ==
Testing infants is complex and challenging and determining the right age that a child develops their sense of sex or other's sex. A baby does not decide if it is a boy or a girl, but it is decided by others if the child is feminine or masculine. Sex differences as children play start at 17 months. Children start understanding gender differences at that age influences gender stereotypes in play, where boys play with certain toys and girls with others. Children between 3 and 6 months can form distinctions between males and female faces. By ten months, infants can associate certain things with females and males, like a hammer with a man or scarf with a woman. At any point, research suggests that children who assert a gender-diverse identity know their gender as clearly and consistently as their developmentally matched peers and benefit from the same level of support, love, and social acceptance. However, all children need support, love, and care from family, school, and society, which fosters growth into happy and healthy adults.

== Social impacts ==
The social impacts of imposing gender roles on children become evident very early in life and usually follow the child as they continue their development. It is most observable when they interact with other members of their age group. For example, social environments during childhood have a huge influence on the significance of gender roles and self-identity growing up. These social environments could be extended to adult roles such as parents, social media, and school. A child's peers serve as both an archetype and a sounding board for the proper way to express themselves. Alice Eagly affirms the idea that gender roles are a direct result of one's social interactions. She calls social behavior "gender-stereotypic" and says that most of the expectations of gender roles come from the stereotypes associated with them, such as a woman to be kind and compassionate and a man to be in control and independent. "This theory implicates conformity to gender-role expectations as a major source of the sexes' differing behavior." As a child explores those things in life that they may enjoy, the acceptance or criticism or their peers is crucial in whether or not they will continue to perform an activity.

Children are especially apt at noticing when one of their peers violates their established gender role. As Fagot (1990) found, children had a pronounced response when one of their peers violated their established gender role. Same-sex peers acted as the distributors of both rewards for proper gender role behavior and punishments for improper gender role behavior. Boys who preferred to play with dolls rather than trucks were five to six times more likely to be harassed by their peers than those who conformed to the norm. Girls who preferred to play firefighter rather than nurse were ignored rather than criticized. Most importantly, Fagot's study shows the effect of gender segregation on children; boys tended to respond more readily to feedback from other boys while girls likewise responded to feedback from other girls. By surrounding themselves with members of the same sex, children are placing themselves in a situation where they more readily accept and conform to accepted gender roles. In a study, it was found that the use of toys had an influence on the cognitive skills of children. For example, if a child tends to use more feminine toys such as a doll they would be associated with a more nurturing nature, whereas a child using masculine toys they are associated with more aggressive behavior as well as spatial skills.

In-group and out-group hostility at a young age is associated with a child liking their sex identity and seeking to maintain stereotype characters rather than hostility towards the out-group. Pre-schoolers and children aged 3–5 show a negative reaction and punishment like ridicule when someone from their in-groups, either boys or girls, play with a toy associated with the out-group. Less masculine boys are laughed at and often shunned in school and rejected by their peers. Gender prejudice begins as early as pre-school. Gender typing is extreme in young children where girls may refuse to wear anything but dresses and boys will not play with anything associated with a girl. However, the rigidity ends, and individual differences occur over 10–12 years.

A study by Carol Martin (1990) shows that cross-sex behavior is generally discouraged in both sexes, though more so in males. Those that do exhibit cross-sex behavior are branded as either a sissy (a rather derogatory term used for boys exhibiting feminine characteristics) or a tomboy (a term for girls exhibiting male characteristics, though not as stigmatized as sissy). Gender roles place constraints upon what a child is allowed to do, based upon what their peers deem is acceptable.

As children grow older and are more able to grasp the concept of gender and gender roles, they begin to spend more time with children of the same sex, further exacerbating the proliferation of gender roles. Martin and Fabes observed that by the age of two, children were already beginning to show a preference for interacting with children of the same sex. By the time a child is three or four, the vast majority of their peer interactions are with members of the same sex. As Maccoby observed, by the age of four and a half, children spend three times as much time with same-sex play partners; by six and a half, that amount increases to eleven times. Martin and Fabes observed that as the children began to segregate themselves by gender, the activities they performed also aligned with their chosen play partners; boys tended to choose playmates who were more active and rowdy while girls chose playmates that were more calm and cooperative.

Children generally fall into these patterns with little guidance from either parents or teachers; they are encouraged to interact with members of the same sex and begin to adopt behavior that is considered gender appropriate. This phenomenon is known as self-socialization and drives the interaction between children throughout their young lives. This instinctive segregation encourages the gap between males and females and helps to reinforce gender roles as the child continues to grow.

Sex stereotypes limit both women and men when it comes to choices. Men tend not to vote for women as presidents, a form of how in-group stereotypes at young age shapes behavior.

== Social cognitive theory and its impact on gender role development ==
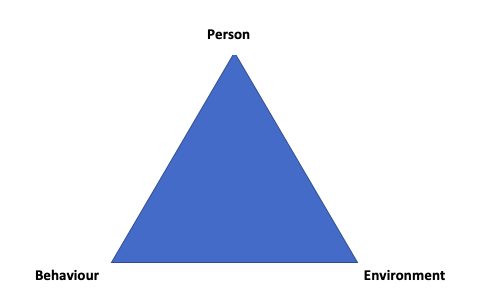
Albert Bandura's Social Cognitive Theory

Within social cognitive theory, also known as social learning theory, behaviors are learned through observation, modeling, and positive or negative reinforcement. Although there are many theories surrounding gender development (biological, social, and cognitive), however the main focus of this article will pertain to social cognitive theory, developed by Albert Bandura. Social approaches to gender development consider how males and females adopt different gender norms and stereotypes throughout their childhoods when exposed to them in their environment, whether that be at home, in school, or with their peers.

Prior to the name "Social Cognitive Theory," gender development was originally viewed through a traditional learning standpoint, which stemmed from behaviorism. This was developed through the premise that children develop gender-based behaviors and stereotypes through positive and negative reinforcement. For example, positive reinforcement is used when a child plays with a toy consistent with their gender and negative reinforcement is used when a child plays with a toy that is not consistent with their gender, therefore, "the behavior that is rewarded increases and the behavior that is punished decreases." In the early 1960s, traditional learning theory was changed to social learning theory by psychologists like Albert Bandura due to the acknowledgement of the significance of modeling and imitation in social development. In 1966, Walter Michel was the first to apply social learning theory to gender development in his book "The Development of Sex Differences." Learning through observation, also known as modeling, "refers to a person's tendency to learn vicariously by observing other people engage in gender-typed behaviors and witnessing the responses that these people receive from others." Albert Bandura then revised social learning theory again in the 1980s into social cognitive theory. First introduced to gender development in 1999, his idea was to improve upon social learning theory by adding the importance of cognitive influences on learning and a stronger emphasis on social and environmental influences.

Gender has a great influence on an individual's personality, social life, and decisions. Western societies are structured by the two-sex model which "refers to our understanding of people existing as two biologically dichotomous sexes." This model also explains what it means to be masculine vs. feminine in this culture. Gender is different from sex, however, as sex is biological while gender is "socially and psychologically constructed, referring to the given roles, behaviors, and characteristics deemed appropriate for either a man or a woman, as determined by social norms."

Social cognitive theorists argue that gender development occurs due to three factors: personal, behavioral, and environmental. Personal factors are an individual's own thoughts, observations and decisions; behavioral factors are actual actions taken out; environmental factors are any social influences faced by an individual. Although many environments can and have been used to conduct research on child gender development, the family is one of the greatest influences because it provides the child's first experience with gender-related ideals. According to Martin and Ruble, "Parental expectations about what it means to have a child who is either a boy or girl become displayed as actions with the child, and these embodied expectations interact with the child's phenotypic and early behavioral factors." From the beginning, children look at their mothers and fathers as role models. Parents share, portray, and model behaviors that children soon associate as what men and women should and should not do. Not only are gender norms and stereotypes formed at this time in an adolescents life, but also emotions. Girls are taught how to handle and display their emotions differently than boys. A girl crying is more accepted in Western societies than a boy crying. Girls are expected to be more feminine, emotional and welcoming (internalizing emotions) while boys are expected to hold back emotions and display masculinity (externalizing emotions). This can be portrayed simply through how a parent speaks about and reacts to a child's behaviors and emotions. It was found through research that mothers who held strong gender stereotypes to their daughters resulted in the same stereotypes being presented in their daughters.

Along with parental influence on gender norms and stereotypes, there is also an influence from siblings. Research has proven that young children who have same-sex siblings of older age were more likely to adopt their sibling's gender related norms and stereotypes than those children with opposite-sex siblings. There is an essential hypothesis in social learning theory in which gender development in children is partially influenced more by same-sex model figures than by opposite-sex model figures. As previously mentioned, this is a possibility and research has proven that, however, further evidence states "children discern what behaviors are appropriate for each sex by watching the behavior of many male and female models and by noticing the differences between the sexes in the frequency with which certain behaviors are performed in certain situations."

Not only does social cognitive theory prove that modeling parents, siblings, and peers influence adolescent gender norms, but it also proves that children model behaviors and ideas seen on television and other forms of media. A study was conducted in which researchers had young boys and girls watch superhero media. The research found that the younger boys modeled the superhero behavior seen on television, while the girls did not. This proves that the observation of television role-models and other media have great influence on children, especially when the media portrays gender norms specific to one gender (ex: superheroes appeal more to boys than girls, whereas princesses appeal more to girls.) Overall, social cognitive theory, also known as social learning theory, has proven that young boys and girls learn through modeling, positive and negative reinforcement in reaction to gender-typed behavior, and thus form their own expectancies, thoughts, and norms regarding gender.
