= Pinkstinks =

Campaign from the United Kingdom

- Formation: 2008
- Type: Campaign
- Headquarters: London
- Founders: Emma Moore and Abi Moore
- Website: Archived UK website

Pinkstinks is a campaign founded in London in May 2008 by twin sisters Emma Moore and Abi Moore (born 1971, London) to raise awareness of what they claim is damage caused by gender stereotyping of children. Pinkstinks claims that the marketing of gender-specific products to young children encourages girls to limit their ambitions later in life.

== Activities ==
Pinkstinks has created a listing of "Pinkstinks Approved" companies providing non-gender-specific play and learning products for children. In 2009 the campaign was reported as urging parents to boycott shops selling pink toys and gifts. In 2010 Pinkstinks criticised Marks and Spencer for labelling underwear aimed at six-year-old girls as "bra tops". John Lewis, Marks and Spencer and Sainsbury's have responded quickly to criticism by Pinkstinks, removing a "girls" label from a pink Playmobil set and a "boys" label from a science kit and adding non-gender-specific labels to children's nurse and doctor outfits.

== Awards and recognition ==
The campaign's founders, Abi and Emma Moore, won an award in the Women Creating Change category at the 2009 Sheila McKechnie Foundation awards. In 2012 Pinkstinks won the Mumsnet Award for Promoting Body Confidence in Children.

In 2009 Bridget Prentice MP, who was then British Government Justice Minister, backed Pinkstinks' campaign to boycott shops selling Christmas gifts which were aimed particularly at either girls or boys, saying "It's about not funnelling girls into pretty, pretty jobs, but giving them aspirations and challenging them to fulfil their potential". Speaking in the UK Parliament, Lady Morgan, the junior children's minister, said that "it is extremely important that we ensure girls have a chance to play with trucks and trains and wear blue if they look pretty in blue and we shouldn't be defining how young people are looked after by the colour of their toys".

The campaign has also been backed by Ed Mayo, author and former UK government adviser on consumer issues, who said: "I feel this colour apartheid is one of the things that sets children on two separate railway tracks. One leads to higher pay, and higher status and one doesn't." According to Mayo, before World War II pink was more usually associated with boys, while blue – traditionally the colour of the Virgin Mary – was linked with girls. He said: "When you walk into a toy store, as the campaign Pinkstinks has argued, it is as if feminism had never happened."

== International impact ==
Pinkstinks has attracted attention in other countries and has inspired the setting up of a similar campaign in Germany, set up in 2012 and based in Hamburg-Eimsbüttel.

== See also ==
- Feminism in the United Kingdom
- Gendered associations of pink and blue
- Gender neutrality
- Gender polarization
- Gender stereotypes
- Lego Friends § Controversy
- Let Books Be Books
- Let Girls Be Girls
- Let Toys Be Toys
