= California Assembly Bill 1084 (2021) =

California law

California State Legislature
- Introduced: February 18, 2021
- Signed into law: October 9, 2021
- Sponsors: Evan Low; Cristina Garcia
- Governor: Gavin Newsom
- Code: Civil Code
- Section: §55.7, §55.8
- Bill: AB 1084
- Website: Full text of the bill

Status: Current legislation (Took effect on January 1, 2024)

California Assembly Bill 1084 (also Britten's Bill) is a 2021 California statute requiring department stores in California to maintain a gender neutral children's section. It was passed by the California State Legislature and signed into law by California Governor Gavin Newsom in October 2021, and enforcement began in 2024.

== Purpose and history ==
Bill 1084 was introduced to the California State Assembly by Assemblymembers Evan Low and Cristina Garcia on February 18, 2021. Similar bills had been unsuccessfully introduced in 2019 and 2020. The bill was signed into law by California Governor Gavin Newsom on October 9, 2021. At the time of its signing into law, Assembly Bill 1084 was unique to California; similar legislation had not been proposed in any other state.

The segregation of toys by a social construct of what is appropriate for which gender is the antithesis of modern thinking.

— Evan Low

California Assembly Bill 1084 was intended to assist consumers with comparison shopping by encouraging stores to group similar items together. It was additionally meant to limit the reinforcement of gender roles, which is one effect of traditional gender divisions in children's sections. The law states that separating items marketed toward girls from those marketed toward boys "makes it more difficult for the consumer to compare the products and incorrectly implies that their use by one gender is inappropriate".

Assemblymember Low said that the bill was inspired by 9-year-old Britten Sires, whose mother is one of Low's staffers. Sires told her mother that she was uncomfortable with the gendered setup of the toy aisles, saying that "boys is more like knowledge and trying to get them smarter so they can get into a good college and get a good job, and then women's is more like makeup and cooking sets." Her mother shared her experience with Low, leading to the development of the bill. As a result, the bill was sometimes referred to as "Britten's Bill".

== Provisions ==
Assembly Bill 1084 proposed that department stores in California, specifically those which employed 500 or more employees in the state and sold products intended for children, be required to maintain a gender neutral section displaying a "reasonable selection" of toys and other children's items without regard for "whether they have been traditionally marketed for either girls or boys." Upon its passage, these proposals became law.

The bill does not apply to children's clothing, and does not restrict the display of gendered shopping areas in addition to the gender neutral section.

Upon passing, the bill modified Division 1 of the California Civil Code, adding Part 2.57 "Gender Neutral Retail Departments", including Sections 55.7 and 55.8.

=== Penalties ===
Enforcement for the bill is set to begin on January 1, 2024, after which noncompliant businesses will be fined up to $250. Repeated violations of the bill will each result in an additional penalty of up to $500. Stores which are fined may also be liable for attorney’s fees and costs incurred by the state government or any city or district governments in relation to the fine.

== Reception ==
=== As proposed legislation ===
Assembly Bill 1084 was supported by the Consumer Federation of California on the grounds that it would benefit consumers by facilitating easier comparison of similar products. The bill was opposed by various business groups which expressed opposition to additional government regulation, as well as various conservative groups; the Capitol Resource Institute characterized the proposed legislation as "[overstepping] the natural process of the free market", while the president of the conservative California Family Council said that it would "force retailers to espouse government-approved messages about gender" and was therefore "a violation of free speech". The Pacific Justice Institute stated that it would "impose a de-gendered ideology and viewpoint on retailers".

The editorial board of the Los Angeles Times published an article arguing that the state legislature should not be focusing on "rearranging the toy shelves in major retail chains". The article stated that other tasks such as adapting to climate change, preventing wildfires in California, and resolving issues with education during the COVID-19 pandemic should instead be the priorities of the legislature. While noting that "it’s a great idea for stores to create toy sections where boys don’t feel odd for choosing a baby doll and girls feel welcome to take home a toy truck", the editorial board described the bill as "nannyish overreach" that represented "another inch in the Legislature’s mission creep from public policymaker to private overseer".

=== As law ===
The bill's passage into law drew criticism from conservatives. Greg Abbott, governor of Texas, was critical of the new law on Twitter; a post on Sean Hannity's blog described it as "'woke' culture encroaching on private business". Larry Elder, who unsuccessfully campaigned against Gavin Newsom to be governor of California, released a video promoted by the far-right Epoch Times that described the law as "freedom-compromising" and "job-killing".

The California Retailers Association declined to comment on the bill after its passage into law, while conservative groups continued to oppose it.
