= Caroline Phillips (journalist) =

Scottish feminist, suffragette and journalist (1870s–1956

- Born: 13 December 1870 or 1874; Kintore, Aberdeenshire, Scotland
- Died: 13 January 1956 (aged 81-82 or 85); Kintore, Aberdeenshire, Scotland
- Resting place: Kintore kirkyard
- Occupation: Journalist
- Known for: Suffragette and journalist. Honorary secretary for the Aberdeen branch of the WSPU

Caroline Agnes Isabella Phillips (13 December 1870 or 1874 (Note: There are contradictory reports on her date of birth: 13 December 1870; or 1874) – 13 January 1956) was a Scottish feminist, suffragette and journalist. She was honorary secretary of the Aberdeen branch of the Women's Social and Political Union (WSPU), met and corresponded with many of the leaders of the movement and was also involved in the organisation of militant action in Aberdeen.

== Early life and work ==
Caroline Agnes Isabella Phillips was born on 13 December 1870 or 1874 in Kintore, Aberdeenshire to James Phillips, a head teacher, and Jane Phillips (née Watt), a sewing teacher. Caroline Phillips worked for the Aberdeen Daily Journal – the more conservative of the two daily newspapers in Aberdeen at this time. In the Edwardian era, there were only 66 female journalists in the whole United Kingdom.

She was based out of offices in Broad Street, Aberdeen – which later became the offices for the Evening Express – and her dedication to campaigning for women's suffrage meant she often landed herself in trouble with her employer.

When she was eventually banned from attending political meetings, this made it very difficult for her to carry out her job as a journalist. Yet conflict with the newspaper did not deter her from spearheading the fight for women's suffrage in and around Aberdeen.

== Campaigning for women's suffrage ==
Phillips was the leader of the Aberdeen suffragettes from 1907-1909, and organised a march in Edinburgh in 1907. Phillips wrote letters to the press. While the Daily Journal was strongly against women’s suffrage, Phillips was able to get pro-suffrage arguments into conservative newspapers through the Letters To The Editor column. Shamelessly, she often used the Aberdeen Daily Journal's address as the address for correspondence relating to the WSPU and drafted WSPU-related letters on Daily Journal notepaper. In January 1908, her employer warned Phillips that she was ‘identifying’ herself far too closely with the woman’s suffrage movement and that if she didn't stop being involved in women’s politics she could lose her job. She also added “Votes for Women” standards to flags on golf courses.

Her role as Honorary Secretary for the Aberdeen branch of the Women's Social and Political Union meant she met and corresponded with many of the leadership of the WSPU. However, Phillips fitted more into the role of a suffragist rather than a suffragette. Suffragists believed in using political means to achieve votes for women, while suffragettes employed the notion of "deeds not words". Hence, Phillips disagreed with the increasingly militant approach being employed by the WSPU. The suffragette headquarters had asked senior member Amy Sanderson to go up to Aberdeen urgently in September 1907.

One example of this was, in December 1907, when Emmeline Pankhurst planned on disrupting the then Chancellor of the Exchequer, Henry Asquith's, visit to Aberdeen's Music Hall and Phillips did her level best to stop this from happening. Phillips had learned that the local Liberal association considered banning all women from entrance in case suffragettes had planned to disrupt proceedings. As a result, Phillips contacted the local Women’s Liberal Association officials, offering to guarantee that there would be no such disruption. She believed that the local suffragettes should keep away from the event in order to let the women of the Aberdeen Women's Liberal Association attend and thought the WSPU leadership would understand and accept her reasoning.

Phillips was overruled by Emmeline Pankhurst. Pankhurst arrived in Aberdeen and carried through with her plan to lead a protest. The disruption took place and it resulted in a fight in the orchestra pit and the suffragettes being thrown out. Phillips' tenure as leader of the Aberdeen suffragettes would never recover from this clash with the WSPU leadership.

In 1909, Phillips was relieved of leading the Aberdeen branch. A letter she had written suggested the WSPU should copy a non-violent strategy favoured by the peaceful National Union of Women's Suffrage Societies (NUWSS). The Pankhursts' reaction to the letter was swift. Christabel Pankhurst, co-founder of the WSPU wrote to Phillips in a telegram which arrived on Tuesday 5 January 1909. It stated:

“Sylvia Pankhurst arrives Thursday morning to take charge local work. Thursdays meeting had better be abandoned”

Phillips had been a prominent figure in the Scottish suffragette movement but it was clear she had fallen out of favour. She would be the last Aberdonian woman to lead the movement. Sylvia Pankhurst, Emmeline’s daughter, took over the Aberdeen branch initially as things became more militant in Aberdeen and across the whole of Scotland. This was followed later on with the closing down of the Aberdeen branch completely and the invitation to all its members to join the wider WSPU, under direct control from London, instead.

== Later life and legacy ==
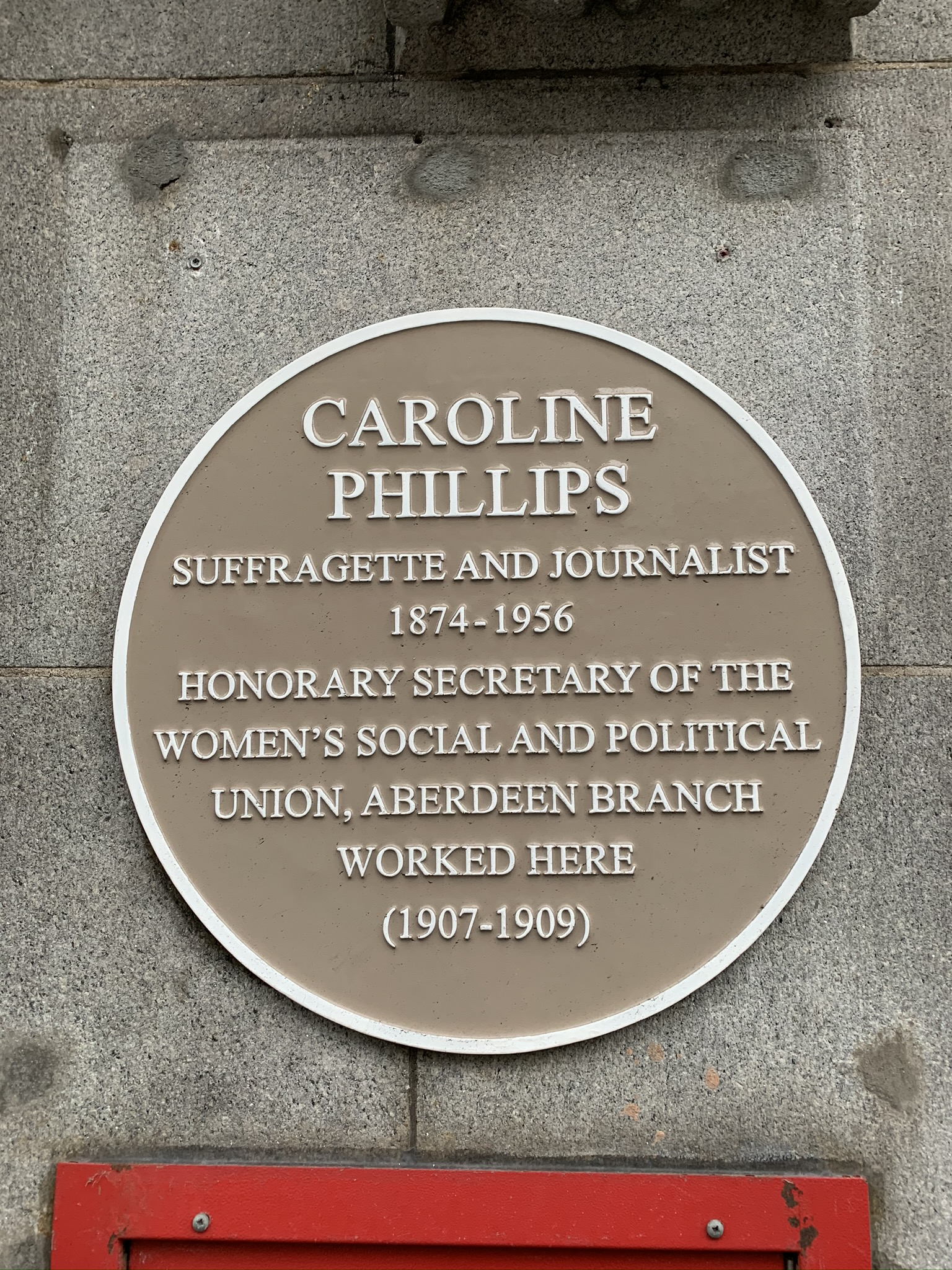
Commemorative plaque to Phillips, Union St in Aberdeen.

In 1912, Phillips inherited the Station Hotel in Banchory from an aunt and moved out of Aberdeen. Her editor said at her leaving do: "If only she hadn’t been involved in other things she would have made a good reporter."

Phillips devoted herself to the hotel until her retirement to Kintore in the 1940s.

Professor Sarah Pedersen of Robert Gordon University said of Caroline Phillips:

"Caroline Phillips was very well-respected in the suffragette movement. She had a career as a journalist as well as her role as a suffragette. She was torn between her job and her commitment to the movement. It fascinates me that she was putting her career on the line for this movement. It was also very unusual for a woman to have a role as a journalist at that time – that in itself is making a huge statement. She was quite shameless and would often write letters for the suffrage movement using work paper and equipment. It got her into a lot of trouble and must have been very difficult for her. I think it’s fantastic that these women that have been a little bit swallowed up by history are now being remembered in their own right as well as some of the more well-known figures in the suffragette movement. “It’s so important to talk about this movement and the different cities and people involved in it."

She died in Kintore on 13 January 1956 at the age of 85, where she is buried. Her funeral was held at Aberdeen Crematorium on 17 January.

In 1988, Rosemary Watt, a relative of Phillips, presented written correspondence between Phillips and members of the suffragette movement to Aberdeen Art Gallery.

In 2021, Phillips was one of a collection of Scottish suffragists celebrated in a deck of cards distributed as part of an education pack to 100 schools around the country.

== See also ==
- Women's suffrage in the United Kingdom
