= Sarah Pedersen =

Researcher, author on suffrage and women's rights

Sarah L. Pedersen is a British academic researcher and writer. Pedersen's research focuses on women's engagement with the media and politicians. She holds a chair as Professor of Communication and Media at Robert Gordon University, in Scotland.

== Career ==
Pedersen studied history at York University and did a Masters in Medieval History and drama, before moving into publishing. In her academic career, she joined Robert Gordon's University as professor in publishing, and in her own writing she uses modern and historical sources. She is the author of The Scottish Suffragettes and the Press In 2017 she gained Heritage Lottery funding to write about Aberdeen suffragette and journalist Caroline Phillips. Pederson also investigated correspondence from women in the public and private sphere during World War One. She writes about women's participation in higher education and in academia.

She was the Director of the Rise Up Quines! festival in Aberdeen in 2018 and established Quinepedia – a digital biographical dictionary and celebration of women, and women's history in North-East Scotland. She has published a web based map of women's suffrage actions in Aberdeen.

Pedersen has written about the politicising of MumsNet and the protests by women against the Scottish Government's proposed reforms of the Gender Recognition Act. Her work also extended to blogging in general and police staff blogging in particular.

In 2025, she resigned from an unspecified charitable organisation due to uncertainty surrounding continued Scottish Government backing in light of her gender-critical stance.

== Census protests ==
Pedersen drew connections between the historical protest actions of the suffragettes in relation to the 1911 census and the attempts by organisations such as For Women Scotland, to disrupt the 2022 Scottish census administration.

Protesters used their census returns to register a protest around guidance relating to the Sex question. The protest was designed to confound the processing of data and the use of machines to read the forms. Although protesters hoped their protests would be visible to future history researchers in 100 years’ time data-protection policies mean many of their actions were not recorded.
