= Let Toys Be Toys =

Advocacy campaign

- Formation: November 2012
- Type: Advocacy group
- Purpose: To counter gender stereotyping of children’s toys
- Subsidiaries: Let Books Be Books
- Website: www.lettoysbetoys.org.uk

Let Toys Be Toys is a campaign designed to persuade retailers to stop categorising toys by gender. It was started by a group of parents on the parenting on-line discussion forum Mumsnet.

== History ==
In 2012, a thread was opened on the Mumsnet online forum which said: "If you think that girls and boys should feel free to play with whatever toys that interest them most, and that they shouldn't walk into a toy store and feel pressurised to conform into archaic gender roles and stifling stereotypes, please join in the discussion!" As a result of the debate which followed, the Let Toys Be Toys campaign was officially launched in November 2012. Shortly afterwards, volunteer mystery shoppers from the campaign visited various retailers to gather information about how they were promoting toys; this was then used to decide which should be targeted by the campaign. The organisers set out their objectives, saying:

“Toys are for fun, for learning, for stoking imagination and encouraging creativity. Children should feel free to play with the toys that most interest them. Isn’t it time that shops stopped limiting our children’s imagination by telling them what they ought to play with? The answer is simple – we’re asking retailers and manufacturers to sort and label toys by theme or function, rather than by gender, and let the children decide which toys they enjoy best. Let toys be toys – for girls and boys.”

In February 2014, Chi Onwurah, MP for Newcastle upon Tyne Central, mentioned the Let Toys Be Toys campaign in a parliamentary debate she had called on gender-specific toy marketing. She told the House of Commons:

“Before entering Parliament, I spent two decades as a professional engineer, working across three continents. Regardless of where I was or the size of the company, it was always a predominantly male, or indeed all-male, environment, but it is only when I walk into a toy shop that I feel I am really experiencing gender segregation. At some point over the past three decades, the toy industry decided that parents and children could not be trusted to figure out what to buy without colour-coded gender labelling—that means Science museum toys being labelled “for boys”, whereas miniature dustpans and brushes are “Girl Stuff”, according to SportsDirect.

I say over the past three decades, because there was a time when toys were toys and blue and pink were just colours. An Argos catalogue page from 1976 shows toy houses, prams and so on all in different colours. Now they only sell them in pink. Recently, a Lego advert from 1981 went viral on the internet because it showed a girl proudly clasping her latest Lego creation. None of the text was gender-specific and the girl was actually wearing blue.

What happened? Did someone dye the Y chromosome blue in the ’80s or force the X chromosome to secrete only pink hormones? No. This aggressive gender segregation is a consequence of big-company marketing tactics. Every successful marketeer knows that differentiation makes for greater profit margins and segmentation gives a bigger overall market, so with three-year-old girls only being able to “choose” pink tricycles, the manufacturer can charge more for that special girly shade of pink and the premium princess saddle. Of course, that trike cannot be handed over to a brother or nephew, ensuring further sales of blue bikes with Action Man handlebars. It has got to the point where it is difficult to buy toys for girls that are not pink, princess-primed and/or fairy-infused.”

Onwurah later told Kira Cochrane, a reporter for UK Newspaper The Guardian, that she believes the limiting of children by gender stereotypes is a serious economic issue, with the proportion of female students on engineering degree courses having fallen from 12% to 8% in the thirty years since she had started studying for one herself. She said: "We have some big economic problems, and one is a huge skills shortage in engineering and technology. There are thousands of jobs going unfilled, and in addition a lot of our engineers are in their 50s and retiring in the next five years. At the same time we have the lowest proportion in Europe of women who are professional engineers. […] Toys are so important and formative, and for me this is about the jobs of the future, about what happens in 10 or 15 years' time. We can't go on with a segregated society."

In October 2014, Jess Day, a Let Toys be Toys campaigner told UK newspaper the Daily Mirror:

"It's easy to dismiss toys as trivial, but this is one way we can help our children feel confident that they don't have to fit in with old-fashioned stereotypes. Labelling construction toys as boys’ toys and craft or dolls as girls’ toys restricts play. Play is important and different types toys help hone different skills. Telling girls that construction and science toys are for boys we limit what they think they can achieve before they've even had the chance to try it out. […] There's nothing wrong with giving a girl a doll for Christmas, or a boy a car – but children need a variety of play. Why would we want to tell them that only certain types of play are allowed for them? That sounds like the opposite of fun!”

The Fawcett Society published the results of an 18-month study into gender stereotyping's impact on young children in December 2020, together with a list of ten cheap gender-neutral toys and games in collaboration with Let Toys Be Toys.

== Response from retailers and manufacturers ==
Amongst early responses from retailers were decisions by Boots UK and The Entertainer to remove all ’boys’ and ‘girls’ toys signage in their stores, and a promise from Marks and Spencer to make all their toy ranges inclusive. By December 2013, one year after the launch of Let Toys Be Toys, half of the 14 major retailers contacted by the campaign had already removed in-store ‘girls’ and boys’ signage and stopped using gendered labelling on their own-brand toy packaging; a further five were taking steps to do so.

A pre-Christmas survey of toyshops in the UK and Ireland conducted by Let Toys Be Toys supporters in November 2013 showed a 60% reduction in the use of gendered signs in retail outlets in comparison to Christmas 2012 when the campaign began. Retailer Hobbycraft came top of the list of stores promoting and selling toys without relying on gender stereotypes and was named the ’best of the high street’ by the campaign; Toymaster and Fenwick came second and third respectively. Fenwick was also, along with Debenhams and TK Maxx, named as the most improved store; all three had decided to stop using ’girls’ and ’boys’ signage. However, overall the campaign's survey found that more than 70% of stores inspected used some form of gender-based marketing; gender-based labelling was used to sell the majority of toys in 40%. Let Toys Be Toys co-founder Kerry Brennan said:

“While there’s still a long way to go to address sexism in the toy industry, the changes in major retail chains like Debenhams are just brilliant to see. They’ve replaced pink and blue ‘girls’ and ‘boys’ signs with new colourful signs that say ‘Vehicles’, ‘Superheroes’, ‘Soft Toys’, and ‘TV Characters’, among others. Everything is much easier to find and children are no longer being sent the message that science and adventure are only for boys, crafts and nurturing play only for girls”.

In November 2014, supermarket chain Tesco removed "gift for a boy" signage from superhero alarm clocks in its shops after a shopper's photo of her "superhero-loving" daughter next to the sign was posted on Twitter and retweeted more than 10,000 times. Tesco apologised saying the clock would "make a great gift for both girls and boys". Let Toys Be Toys said the group was pleased the photo had resulted in the removal of the sign, adding: "Signs like these do influence people in their choice of what toys to buy children […and they] "make children feel 'wrong' for liking certain things".

On 30 November 2014, UK newspaper The Independent on Sunday reported the story of a seven-year-old girl who had been upset when the best and most complex train sets disappeared from the Toys R US website when her mother applied the “For girls” filter. She had asked her mother to apply the filter as she had previously been bullied at school because she liked dinosaurs and had worn Spider-Man sandals. Her mother told the newspaper that her daughter had asked "Why are they saying I can't have that train set because I am a girl?" She had then lost "all confidence in her choices" and said that she didn't want a train set for Christmas after all. Following a complaint, Toys R Us’ managing director phoned the mother to discuss the issue and to offer vouchers as compensation for the upset caused by the incident. The Independent on Sunday report also noted: “Interestingly, Amazon does not tend to use gender on its UK site, although gender signposting is prominent in its main US site.” It added that: “… a letter ‘To Parents’ thought to have been included in a 1974 Lego boxset saying ‘The urge to create is equally strong in all children. Boys and girls’ has also been getting thousands of shares on social media”.

Let Toys Be Toys were consulted by Arklu Ltd. when it designed and marketed its Lottie Dolls range of products.

== Awards ==
In November 2013 Let Toys Be Toys were awarded the Progressive Preschool 2013 Marketing Award for their campaign against sexism in toy retail.

The campaign was shortlisted in the 2014 National Diversity Awards and in March 2015 came top in the Advocacy category in Westbourne Comms third annual Change Opinion awards. This was followed by a win in the Care2 Awards presented in May 2015. In January 2016 it was announced that Let Toys Be Toys had won the Brio Prize.

== Other campaigns inspired by Let Toys Be Toys ==
=== Let Books Be Books ===
Let Toys Be Toys campaigners launched the Let Books Be Books campaign to persuade publishers to remove gender labels from their book titles and to encourage publishers and retailers to stop promoting books as ‘for girls’ or ‘for boys’. The campaign was supported by prominent authors including former and current children's laureates Anne Fine and Malorie Blackman, the poet laureate Carol-Ann Duffy, and Philip Pullman. Publishers Parragon Books, Usborne Publishing, Ladybird Books, Dorling Kindersley, Chad Valley and Miles Kelly Publishing were amongst those who announced that they would no longer be publishing gender-specific titles.

=== Let Clothes Be Clothes ===
Let Clothes Be Clothes launched in 2014 as an allied but separate campaign to Let Toys Be Toys, focused on challenging gender stereotyping in the design and marketing of childrenswear, footwear and accessories on the UK high street. The campaign is led by writer and activist Francesca Cambridge Mallen, a former indie business owner who in 2013 started making childrenswear from home after becoming concerned at the lack of STEM themed clothing marketed to girls. Inspired by Craftivist Sarah Corbett, Mallen taught herself to make simple space themed dresses, dinosaur skirts and unicorn trousers, selling under the name Sewing Circus until she sold the business in 2018.

In 2015 the campaign challenged a range of science themed t-shirts produced in collaboration between Marks and Spencer and the Natural History Museum in London, which were marketed to boys only. In March 2015 a demonstration led by Let Clothes Be Clothes took place outside the Natural History Museum where staff were handed a petition of over 5000 names, demanding that the range be marketed to both boys and girls. The demonstration was supported by Labour MP Chi Onwurah who went on Twitter to encourage others to turn out and support the action stating "girls want a share in science too" as well as her Labour colleague Tessa Jowell "Come on M&S/NHM. The clocks changed but it’s still 2015. Can’t believe I have to say this: girls enjoy science too!”

John Lewis became the first major retailer to remove girls and boys labels from its clothing range. Some declared the move an act of political correctness, including Piers Morgan who tweeted "Britain has officially gone bonkers" over a photograph of the newspaper article. The move was heavily praised by parents and commentators, outweighing more conservative views such as Tory Councillor Luke Stubbs, who threatened to burn his John Lewis Loyalty Card in protest. Writing for the New Statesman, Victoria Smith poked fun at such attitudes stating that perhaps a content warning was needed "whenever there's a risk they might come into contact with a toddler of ambiguous gender presentation?" while at the New Scientist, Lara Williams wrote "If sex and gender aren't a perfect dichotomy - why should clothing be?"

=== Play Unlimited ===
In 2013, the Play Unlimited campaign was launched in Australia by campaigners who had been inspired by Let Toys Be Toys. It was successful in persuading Toys R Us to drop gender labelling from its website.

== See also ==
- Gender polarization
- Gender stereotypes
- The LEGO Group - Gender equality and human rights
- Let Books Be Books
- Pinkstinks
- Creatable World
