= Everyone Is Awesome =

Lego set

The "Everyone is Awesome" Lego set

Everyone is Awesome is a Lego set released in 2021. The Lego product is the first designed to represent the LGBTQIA+ community. It was designed by Matthew Ashton and is themed to represent a pride flag and transgender pride flag, and black and brown colors to represent LGBT people of color.

== Attributes ==
Six-color pride flag designed in 1978

The 2017 Philadelphia eight-stripe flag

The transgender pride flag

2018 Progress Pride Flag by Daniel Quasar

The set has 346 pieces. It comes with 11 minifigures in colors representing pride flags. Six represent colors of the rainbow pride flag (Gilbert Baker's 1978 "classic" flag with red, orange, yellow, green, dark blue, and purple), while three (in pale blue, white, and pink) represent the transgender pride flag, and two (in black and brown) represent the diversity of races, ethnicities, and backgrounds within the queer community. The black and brown stripes mirror Philadelphia's pride flag introduced in 2017.

Each figure has a different hairstyle, also representing the LGBT and Lego community's diversity. None of the eleven figures have specified genders, except for the purple minifigure, meant to represent a drag queen, with a "highly stylized beehive wig".

The Lego set measures about 10 cm × 13 cm (4 in × 5 in); it is designed with a base and back wall, to fit on a shelf or windowsill.

The set name is inspired by "Everything Is Awesome", a song from The Lego Movie, a feature film released in 2014. The set designer, Matthew Ashton, was an executive producer for the film.

== History ==
The Lego Company has a short history of representing the LGBT community in sets. A build of Trafalgar Square, released in 2019, includes a tiny rainbow flag, while sets of bride and groom figurines in the BrickHeadz line were sold separately, allowing fans to purchase two brides or two grooms if they choose to. The "Everyone is Awesome" set is the first set dedicated to the LGBT community in the Lego Company's 89-year history. It comes at a time as the toy industry is releasing products aimed towards more inclusivity.

The set was designed by vice president of design Matthew Ashton, initially for his own desk. Ashton, a member of the LGBTQIA+ community, designed it to make his new office space reflect him. Visitors to Lego's offices noticed it enough that he was prompted to make it an official set. Ashton noted that he grew up as a gay teen in the 1980s, in a daunting time when homophobia was widespread at the height of the HIV/AIDS crisis, and that he was constantly told which toys to play with. He expressed that having a set like this in one's childhood would be a significant relief and sign of support and love.

The set was released June 1, 2021, in time for LGBT Pride Month for many. In releasing the set, the Lego Company highlighted its employee diversity and efforts towards inclusion, as well as partnerships with LGBT organizations including Stonewall.

== See also ==
- Creatable World – gender-neutral dolls produced by Mattel
- List of Lego themes
