= Justine Roberts =

British businesswoman (born 1967)

Justine Juliette Alice Roberts
- Born: 1967 (age 58–59)
- Education: New College, Oxford
- Known for: founder and chief executive of British websites Mumsnet and Gransnet

Justine Juliette Alice Roberts CBE (born October 1967) is the founder and chief executive of British websites Mumsnet and Gransnet.

== Early life ==
Roberts was educated at Guildford High School and at New College, Oxford, where she read PPE.

== Career ==
Roberts was named in the Media Guardian's 2010 power 100. Along with Mumsnet co-founder Carrie Longton, she was voted number 7 in BBC Woman's Hour's "Power List 2013" of the most powerful women in the UK.

In May 2011, Roberts founded Gransnet, a sister site to Mumsnet, for the over-50s.

She has appeared on The Media Show expressing concerns about legislation to regulate blogging, and in May 2013 she appeared on BBC Radio 4's Great Lives programme, nominating football manager Bill Shankly. On 24 December 2015, Roberts was listed by UK-based company Richtopia in the list of 500 Most Influential CEOs in the World.

Roberts was appointed Commander of the Order of the British Empire (CBE) in the 2017 New Year Honours for services to the economy.

== Personal life ==
Roberts married journalist Ian Katz not long before founding Mumsnet. They had four children and separated in 2019.

== Recognition ==
She was recognized as one of the BBC's 100 women of 2013.

== Inspiration and motivation ==
In 2024, Justine Roberts wrote a 'Letter to her younger entrepreneurial self' in which she spoke about how the community around Mumsnet is what inspired her and the purpose they gave her guided the businesses. She also quoted the community's support as the same reason the business "never had to spend much more than maybe £100 on advertising".
