= Let Books Be Books =

Let Books Be Books was founded in March 2014 as a campaign to persuade publishers of children's books to stop labelling and promoting books as 'for boys' or 'for girls'. The campaign, which is led by parents and traces its origins to a thread on the on-line forum Mumsnet, is a spin-off of the Let Toys be Toys campaign, which seeks to get toy manufactures to stop gendering their products.

In its founding statement, the campaign said: “Children are listening, and take seriously the messages they receive from books, from toys, from marketing and the adults around them. Do we really want them to believe that certain things are off-limits for them because of their gender? They’re not ‘getting it wrong’ if a girl likes robots, or if a boy wants to doodle flowers. [...] It's time that publishers Let Books Be Books and leave children free to choose their interests for themselves”.

== Response from authors ==
Prominent authors supporting the Let Books Be Books campaign include former children's laureates Anne Fine and Malorie Blackman, the poet laureate Carol-Ann Duffy, and Philip Pullman.

Anne Fine told UK newspaper The Guardian:

"You'd think this battle would have been won decades ago. But even some seemingly bright and observant adults are buying into it again […] There are girls of all sorts, with all interests, and boys of all sorts with all interests. Just meeting a few children should make that obvious enough. But no, these idiotic notions are spouted so often they become a self-fulfilling societal straitjacket from which all our children suffer".

Also speaking to The Guardian, Pullman, author of the His Dark Materials trilogy, said:

"I'm against anything, from age-ranging to pinking and blueing, whose effect is to shut the door in the face of children who might enjoy coming in. No publisher should announce on the cover of any book the sort of readers the book would prefer. Let the readers decide for themselves".

== Response from publishers ==
In the week following the campaign's launch, Parragon Books responded on Twitter, tweeting: "Feedback on gender-specific titles is important to us. We have no plans to create new titles referring to boy/girl in the UK". In the same week, publisher Usborne announced that a plan to "discontinue publication of titles such as these was decided some time ago”, adding that the company took "feedback on gender-specific titles very seriously” and that it had "no plans to produce any titles labelled 'for girls' or 'for boys' in the future".

On Sunday 16 March, the literary editor of the UK newspaper the Independent on Sunday, Katy Guest, announced:

”Gender-specific books demean all our children. […] So I promise now that the newspaper and this website will not be reviewing any book which is explicitly aimed at just girls, or just boys. Nor will The Independent’s books section. And nor will the children’s books blog at independent.co.uk”.

However, Michael O'Mara, owner of Buster Books defended his company's gender-specific titles, such as The Beautiful Girls' Colouring Book and The Brilliant Boys' Colouring Book, to The Independent on Sunday in March 2014, saying:

”It's a fact of life how a very large percentage of people shop when buying for kids, do it by sex. We know for a fact that when they are shopping on Amazon, they quite often type in 'books for boys' and 'books for girls’”.

In November 2014, Ladybird Books signed up to the Let Books Be Books campaign and announced that it was "committed" to avoiding gendered titles and would be removing such labelling in reprinted copies. The publisher added: "Out of literally hundreds of titles currently in print, we actually only have six titles with this kind of titling". Its parent company, Penguin Random House Children's division, will also be following suit.

Other publishers who have informed Let Books Be Books that they will no longer be publishing gender-specific titles include Dorling Kindersley, Chad Valley and Miles Kelly Publishing.

== See also ==
- Gender neutrality in children's literature
- Gender polarization
- Gender stereotypes
- Let Toys Be Toys
- Pinkstinks
