= Gender typing =

Psychological concept

Gender typing is the process by which a child becomes aware of their gender and thus behaves accordingly by adopting values and attributes of members of the sex that they identify as their own. This process is important for a child's social and personality development because it largely impacts the child's understanding of expected social behavior and influences social judgments.

== Gender identity ==
Once aware of one's gender identity, a child will start to behave in gender roles normally adopted by their same-sex models. Therefore, these individual responses become internalized and function according to the appropriate gender-role standards. The responses that individuals receive from their social group will mold their identity – becoming more feminine or masculine – and thus affect the way they view the world. Other facets of the process can also result in atypical development. Whether a child develops shared traits, cross-gender identities, or androgyny, their decision begins with the identification of a gender and the models they choose to emulate. The behaviors they adopt will ultimately shape their knowledge and identity for who they are and how they should behave.

== Theories ==
=== Freud’s psychoanalytic theory ===
Sigmund Freud believed that children go through stages of psychosexual development. In the third year of the child's life, genitals are thought to become active. As children develop a greater understanding of their own sex they also develop either a castration complex (in boys) or penis envy (in girls). For boys, during the “phallic” stage, they are at the height of childhood sexuality. During this the Oedipus complex occurs, where the boy feels erotic love for his mother (Electra complex in girls where love is directed towards the father). As time progresses and the boy matures, he is slowly able to let go of the rival feelings he has towards his father and free himself from his love for his parents. At this time, the boy learns to emulate masculine attributes from his father and subsequently to identify with him. The girl's development, Freud argued, is more complicated. Generally, as with males, the first object of interest is also the mother figure and for the first four years and beyond a girl remains attached to her mother. However, when the female child learns about “castration” it sparks disappointment and she blames her mother for her lack of a penis. Because of this, the girl gives up masturbation and in turn shifts focus from her mother to her father. By abandoning masturbation the girl can no longer be active, thus displaying a passive nature. The father then assists her by smoothly transitioning her towards a more feminine path. Furthermore, the girl's affection towards her father will also influence her to emulate her mother's feminine qualities and eventually adopt more gender-typed behaviors.

=== Kohlberg’s cognitive-developmental theory ===
The cognitive-developmental theory is also closely linked to Jean Piaget’s analysis for the age-related cognitive changes a child goes through. Lawrence Kohlberg suggested that cognition comes before action and behavior (“I am a boy so I do boy-like things”). This emphasizes the importance of a child's understanding about gender roles and their permanent placement in it. After a child can fully grasp this concept, gender-specific information will become more relevant. This idea of gender consistency, similar to Piaget's concrete-operational stage, is represented by three stages:

1. gender identity: the child recognizes that they are either a boy or a girl and possesses the ability to label others.
2. gender stability: the identity in which they recognizes themselves as does not change
3. gender consistency: the acceptance that gender does not change regardless of changes in gender-typed appearance, activities, and traits.

When the child is able to fully grasp gender stable understanding about themselves, usually between the ages of five and seven, the motivation to master their orientation and to socialize themselves allows them to seek out same-sexed models to learn more about gender-stereotypic behaviors.

=== Gender schema theory ===
A schema is a cognitively organized network of associations that is readily available to help guide an individual's perception. Gender schema theory acts as a guide or standard for consistent behavior in a given scenario. Labels such as “girls are weak and boys are strong,” classifies what stereotypically acceptable actions for the gender groups are. Therefore, the theory proposes the idea that once the child has developed basic knowledge on gender behaviors they will begin to construct gender schemas. This is acquired first through the basic understanding of gender-specific roles. In other words, the child learns the contents of the society, things that are related to their own and the opposite sex, and incorporates it into their gender schemas. The child then learns to apply the appropriate attributes respectively to the right gender by selectively using this knowledge to conceptualize their own actions. Hence, categorizing how they should perform in various situations by molding their capabilities to match the schematic labels.

=== Social-learning theory (Albert Bandura) ===
Social learning theorists, like Albert Bandura, suggest that adults not only provide models for children to imitate, but that they also are actively involved in influencing a child's gender-role identification. The Social learning theory proposes that gender-identities and gender-role preferences are acquired through two concepts.

1. Direct tuition (differential reinforcement): The first concept is represented through direct tuition, also known as differential reinforcement. Early in a child's development, parents are already encouraging gender-appropriate activities and discouraging cross-gender activities. Adults reward children when they display gender-appropriate behavior and punish children when they display cross-gender behavior. The idea of direct tuition expresses that gender-typed behavior begins with the child adopting views they learn from their parents. Therefore, parents reinforce the developmental of gender stereotypes by providing gender-appropriate toys and activities. Adults influence a child's gender identification when they encourage gender-typed behaviors like teaching “boys how to be boys and girls how to be girls”.
2. Observational learning: The second concept is represented through observational learning in where children imitate and follow the behaviors of individuals who are of the same sex. Children become increasingly aware of gender stereotypes in preschool and acknowledge these “same-sex models” when they begin to exercise their preferences for “gender-typed” toys or activities. These same-sex models may include any individual from teachers and older siblings to media personalities.

== Social models ==
There are many opportunities for a child to learn and develop their own understanding of what “gender” is. Thus as children progresses from childhood into adolescence they will already have been exposed to many factors that will influence their ideas and attitudes for normative social behaviors regarding gender roles. Social models, such as parents, siblings, and the media become extremely important during different stages of the child's development.

Parents: Parents play a vital part in a child's early life, for they are the first group of people that a child meets and learns from. The information that surrounds a child at home becomes reinforcements for desired behaviors of a male or female. Studies have shown that as immediate as 24 hours after a child is born most parents have already engaged in gender stereotypic expectations of sons or daughters. Through examples such as painting a room pink or blue, encouragement to participate in shared sex-typed activities, offering gender differentiated toys, or treating the opposite sex child differently, these parent-child interactions have long lasting influence on how a child connects to certain gender-specific behaviors. Furthermore, various evidence suggest that certain household differences affecting how a child is raised can influence how similar (or different) a child is to the opposite sex, therefore how “feminine” or “masculine” the child can potentially become. For instance, as certain research demonstrates, in the absence of a father figure boys are generally more “feminine” than those living with a father. This demonstrates the significance of father-son modeling. The same research reveals that boyhood femininity is more strongly correlated with parental reinforcement such as a father or mother's desire for a girl and/or their approval for feminine behaviours.

Siblings: Apart from parents, children also seek reinforcement from their older siblings. Therefore, inconsistencies for gender behaviors can also be as a result of children emulating their siblings of opposite sex. Sibling's influence is often most effective when the sibling is of an age that is more advanced than the child himself, therefore increasing the motivation for the child to model after their brother or sister. The impact of older siblings are power predictors for the younger sibling's gender role attitudes, sex-typed personality qualities, and masculine leisure activities. Findings suggest that girls develop less traditional attitudes than boys, thus, relative to stereotypically traditional development, older male siblings are more conscientious towards masculine activities, which are evidently modeled after by younger siblings more than feminine activities. Moreover, older brothers tend to have stronger influence over a younger sibling's sexual development. There is evidence that the relationship between older brother and younger sister can, in fact, influence the sister to become more feminine, abiding to more stereotypical gender-typed development than girls with older sisters. Biological studies show that dizygotic twins with the opposite- sex co-twin gender show more sex-typed behaviors than same-sex twins. Conversely, this can also develop in an opposite direction in which children may try to diverge themselves from their siblings as much as possible, making their differences more salient; however, this may be more evident in first-borns possibly due to the birth order.

Peers: At a young age, children can already utilize their knowledge of different social categories to form stereotypes about what they understand about men and women. Interaction with peer groups will often shape people's behavior to fit normative expectations. Children often group together with other children of the same-gender. Belonging in a group that shares the same gender identity will often endorse more gender appropriate traits. An example of this is the fact that girls have more expressive traits than boys. Research also show that children often engage in play with same-sex peers, and exclude others who are different from the norm. For example, children who want to join a group will only be allowed to engage in play if they are a same-gender peer who has had prior experience with the activity, or an opposite-gender peer who has not had prior experience. The desire to engage in play can influence a child to behave like to their peers. In later life, as children starts to move away from their parents, the role of friendship becomes much more influential.

Media: Children learn about different gender categories by observing various forms of media. They often look for gender roles, with whom they can relate to, from books and television. Conversely, these sources of media will also stereotypically shape a child's understanding for gender acceptable behaviors. Studies examining the effects of gender stereotyping in children's literature describe that, most often than not, gender views are affiliated with stereotypes which are both culturally and individually constructed. In children's literature, male characters appear to be more central as well as less emotional and stronger. Female characters on the other hand worked out their feelings through expression, they are more dependent and usually adopt the roles of more domesticated characters. Moreover, these characteristics are also seen in television programing. For example, in most prime-time television shows women receive twice as many comments about her appearance than men. Similarly, a study investigating the cartoon “Pokémon” and gender role expresses the differences in “good” and “bad” characters. Jesse and James (villains of the story) are portrayed to have adopted counter-stereotypical portrayal. While Jesse is seen as more aggressive and James as more feminine, it subtly teaches children that nontraditional or nonstereotypical gender role behaviors are bad. Furthermore, children in the story have difficulty recalling a male Pokémon revealing that there is an imbalance in which prominence is given to male characters. These depictions of male and female character roles can potentially become unconsciously influential in the way a child constructs gender views.

== Atypical gender development and controversies ==
It is expected for children to develop gender-typed behavioural cues given that children often use gender-related information to make judgments. Society often rewards shared traditional behaviours, especially for men, and thus having progressed to a cross-gender development can lead to unwanted criticisms and punishment. Therefore, when children undergo atypical gender development, due to both genetic and environmental contributors, it can drastically alter normal development from a person's sense of self-worth, self-esteem, to feelings of acceptance. When the child identifies as the opposite sex, he or she is then diagnosed with gender dysphoria (often termed gender identity disorder or GID).

Genetics vs. environmental contributors: The development of gender roles has been associated with both genetic and social factors. Current biological research has suggested that testosterone differences can affect sexual orientation, gender identity, and personality. For example, girls with increased prenatal testosterone levels, due to congenital adrenal hyperplasia (CAH), show more male-typed behaviors than the average female. This may cause a decrease in empathy levels, which is proven to be higher in the average women than men, and an increase in physical aggression, typically higher in men than women. Furthermore, multiple twin studies have also shown that homosexual traits displayed greater congruence in monozygotic (MZ) twins than dizygotic (DZ) twins displaying genetic contributions. Further studies reveal that this is especially true for girls' gender-typed values. Similarly, other studies have summarized that the prevalence of cross-gender behavior a highly heritable trait where MZ twins display the same cross-gender behaviors more so than DZ twins. While atypical gender role development may be heritable, this does not mean that it is independent. However, environmental effects can differ largely for different genders. Because society is more accepting of male traits (girls playing soccer) than female traits (boys doing ballet), society's negativity typically forces males to try to stay within the stereotypic norms. That being said however, male influence accounted by environmental factors that lead to atypical development is also stronger for boys than girls in terms of atypical development.

Gender dysphoria: Gender dysphoria or gender identity disorder (GID) occurs when the child identifies as the opposite sex. GID, previously known as transsexualism, occurs when a person has a strong desire to be the opposite sex because they feel uncomfortable in their own body. This may lead to cross-dressing or the desire to rid of their physical characteristic. GID is accompanied with a distress (often referred to as dysphoria) that the individual cannot change their sex and a strong rejection of sex-typical behaviors. Onset of most of these behaviors can occur as early as two to four years of age.

Controversies about gender in DSM-5: For the fifth edition of the Diagnostic and Statistical Manual of Mental Disorders (DSM-5), there has been a debate around whether the sexual and gender identity, which includes the GID, qualifies as a mental disorder. One of the most notable discussions for this occurred in 2003 during the annual APA meeting, where Darryl B. Hill, Ph.D., argued that the GID should not be considered a mental disorder. He explains that due to the limited amount of reliable and valid evidence, given the role of parents and therapies, for whether GID meets the conditions as a mental disorder among children and adolescents. Furthermore, other researchers have stated that the diagnosis does not give recognition to the individual's discomfort with their biological sex which is completely detached from their gender assignment. This leaves patients susceptible to social changes for what is acceptably feminine or masculine. Lastly, it does not provide evidence for nonconformity to traditional gender behaviours which varies between cultures, life stages, genders, and ethnic groups.

Androgyny: Recent studies have shown that androgynous people are able to enhance performance cross-situationally because they can alter their behaviors appropriately to becoming more “masculine” or “feminine” in the given context. According to a study, a person's activity preference in games and interests are purely based on their gender-typed stereotypes, making the person significantly more stereotyped than androgynous people. In a self-esteem test, when individuals were given opposite-sex activities, gender-typed individuals generally felt more uncomfortable, leading to decreased levels of self-esteem. However, androgynous subjects did not feel discomfort or pessimism about themselves. Therefore, gender typing can often lead to specific gender-rule stereotypes to better facilitate decision making which can adhere to certain benefits as well as limitations. Therefore, parents who foster more non-traditional views in sex role orientation tend to encourage a less discriminatory environment. The child can then freely engage in more choices that are not affected by gender limitations. Androgynous children have been found to have higher self-esteem and higher self-worth.

Drawbacks Studies have shown that gender typing is, in fact, not just related to gender-related characteristics that is congruous with the person's biological sex, but rather holds different dimensions. Several studies have also revealed the perks of androgynous individuals such as having more adaptability towards gender-specific situations as well as more flexible attitudes about sex roles. Therefore, while there appear to be many benefits for a gender-congruent identity, it can also result in limitations. Because gender typing often reinforces stereotypes, it tends to attract negative and rigid attitudes towards atypical gender characteristics, activities, and interests. This reinforces the idea that gender-typing does result in certain limitations towards the construction of one's identity.

== Examples of atypical development ==
Boy Raised as Girl After a circumcision accident, Bruce Reimer's parents turned to psychologist Dr. John Money who suggested they raise the boy as a girl. Money believed that environment, not biology, determined gender identity. At 17 months old, Bruce was renamed "Brenda". However, by age 13, "Brenda" was unhappy, lonely, and refused to pursue anything female-typed. Brenda's parents chose to tell Brenda the truth, and he named himself David, and lived as a man from then on. This story ended in tragedy; David committed suicide after his wife left him and he lost his job.

Kate: Ben had never shown interest in “boy” toys, they wanted to wear girl's clothing and grow long hair. Soon they started to make their gender clear: they talked about being a girl and their identity not matching anatomy. Finally, Ben told family they would go by Kate. In the beginning, the child lived a double life. In school, she was “Ben”; at home, she was Kate. Characteristics between the two identities drastically varied. Ben was quiet, shy and withdrawn, while Kate was extroverted and happy. Her parents could see that this was taking a toll on Kate and so they changed to a school where Kate could attend as herself. As the parent learned through this experience, supporting a child's gender identity is extremely important.

Pop: In Sweden, there is a couple who raised their child, Pop, by keeping the child's gender a secret, despite a few people who changed the baby's diaper. The parents stated that they wanted the baby to grow up free and without a gender mold. Pop's wardrobe contains everything from pants to dresses. Pop's parents avoid using pronouns and just refer to their child as “Pop.”

== See also ==
- Gendered associations of pink and blue
- Gender dysphoria in children
- Childhood gender nonconformity
