= Mumsnet =

Internet forum for parents

- Available in: English
- Owner: Mumsnet Limited
- Revenue: £8.6 million
- Website: mumsnet.com
- Registration: Optional
- Launched: 11 January 2000; 26 years ago
- Current status: Online

Mumsnet is a London-based internet forum, created in 2000 by Justine Roberts for discussion among people with children.

== History and finances ==
Mumsnet was created in 2000 by Justine Roberts to help parents pool information and advice, following a disastrous first family holiday with her one-year-old twins. She persuaded her friends Carrie Longton and Steven Cassidy to help her build the site.

It grew to become a popular online forum for parents; in November 2009, the then-Prime Minister Gordon Brown, the opposition leader David Cameron and other UK government ministers took part in live webchats with Mumsnet users. In March 2010 Mumsnet's 10th birthday party was hosted by Google UK at their London headquarters. Guests included Ed Miliband and Steve Hilton, and both Gordon Brown and his wife Sarah gave speeches.

Roberts, the CEO, was named in The Guardian's 2010 Power 100. In February 2013, Roberts and co-founder Longton were assessed as the 7th most powerful women in the United Kingdom by Woman's Hour on BBC Radio 4. Roberts was appointed Commander of the Order of the British Empire (CBE) in the 2017 New Year Honours, for services to the economy.

In 2018, Mumsnet had 1.3 billion page views from 119 million unique users, and a revenue of £8.6 million.

In April 2020, Mumsnet announced a premium membership option.

== Media ==
In November 2009, several political leaders held live chats on Mumsnet in advance of the 2010 United Kingdom general election, in part due to the website's primary demographic being regarded by politicians as key floating voters, with online forums seen as arenas in which their votes could be courted. The Guardian described the general election as the "Mumsnet election". Then-Prime Minister, Gordon Brown, and the leader of the opposition, David Cameron, both appeared on the website's webchats in quick succession, an event that was highly publicised. Conservative commentator Toby Young, in arguing that Mumsnet users constituted a minor and insignificant demographic, commented that the website's users were "Guardian-reading, laptop-wielding harpies", and that the website was "peopled exclusively by university-educated, upper-middle-class women who are only "swing voters" in the sense that they swing between voting Labour, Lib Dem and Green".

Prior to the 2024 general election, the Mumsnet Manifesto was published, outlining user asks for the next government. The site began publishing frequent analysis of conversation and sentiment on site using proprietary data analytics tool MumsGPT.

== Sponsored content ==
As well as selling traditional advertising spaces on the website, Mumsnet also hosts sponsored discussion threads that act as product placements. These sponsored threads take the form of sponsored Q&A threads relevant to the products being marketed, or of "product tests", where site users are offered free samples in exchange for feedback.

In 2010, the Advertising Standards Authority extended its Code of Advertising Practice to include a requirement that paid-for promotional content on social media should be clearly identifiable as an advertisement. In response to this, Mumsnet began to mark product placement discussion threads as "sponsored threads"; during the website's first 10 years, no systematic distinction existed for users to discern between paid-for discussions and user-generated discussions.

== Webchats and Q+As ==
The site has hosted webchats with celebrities and politicians. Then Prime Minister David Cameron was challenged over the provision of free nappies for disabled children, and in 2011, UKIP leader Nigel Farage told Mumsnet users that UKIP MEP Godfrey Bloom was "100% right" in stating that "no self-respecting small businessman with a brain in the right place would ever employ a lady of child-bearing age." In 2019, Jeremy Corbyn and John McDonnell have both faced questions about the Labour Party's Brexit policy and inter-party issues of anti-semitism.

Jamie Oliver, Dawn French, Gok Wan and Clare Balding have all also taken part in Mumsnet webchats. Hillary Clinton also did a video Q&A in 2014.

In 2022, then Prime Minister Boris Johnson took part in a sit down interview with founder Justine Roberts, who posed questions submitted by Mumsnet users. The interview garnered widespread media coverage, driven in part by the first question: "Why should we believe anything you say when it has been proven that you're a habitual liar?".

Rishi Sunak, Keir Starmer and Rachel Reeves have all taken part in similar Q+As.

== Mumsnet books ==
Mumsnet has published several parenting books, based largely on the advice posted by the site's users since its launch in June 2000. These are Pregnancy: The Mumsnet Guide (2009), Toddlers: The Mumsnet Guide (2009) and Babies: The Mumsnet Guide (2010). The website's latest parenting guide, The Mumsnet Rules, was published in 2011.

Other publications include a cookbook titled Top Bananas!: The Best Ever Family Recipes from Mumsnet (2014), The Book of Bedtime Stories (2013) and How to Blitz Nits and Other Nasties (2017).

== Security ==
In April 2014, Mumsnet had user accounts hijacked, and its CEO was impersonated as part of the Heartbleed exploit. The site later published an explanation of the incident saying it was due to Heartbleed and the vulnerability was fixed.

In February 2025, child sexual abuse photos were posted on the forums and remained visible for several hours, as no Mumsnet staff were available, as the management team relied on "volunteer" moderators to patrol the forums outside of standard office hours. This led to a temporary ban on images being allowed on the site.

== Lawsuit ==
In April 2006, lawyers acting for "childcare guru" and former maternity nurse Gina Ford contacted Mumsnet in response to bulletin discussions of Ford's parenting methods, in which users had advocated for personal attacks to be made on Ford and her family. Ford's lawyers claimed that these threads constituted libel, and requested immediate removal of the posts in question. After 12 months of discussion, Mumsnet settled the dispute by apologising publicly to Ford and making a contribution to her legal costs.

In November 2010, Mumsnet co-founder Justine Roberts wrote to Prime Minister David Cameron, urging reform of the draft Defamation Bill to address the rise of online publication.

== Campaigns ==
Mumsnet has initiated several national campaigns, and has publicly supported a number of causes related to parenting. Both the 'Let Toys Be Toys' and 'Let Books Be Books' campaigns had their roots in discussions held on Mumsnet.

In response to forum users' experience with care and support in the National Health Service for miscarried pregnancies, Mumsnet launched its 'Campaign for Better Miscarriage Care'; the campaign proposed a series of recommendations for improving how parents affected by miscarriage were treated within the NHS, detailed in the Mumsnet Miscarriage Code of Care, which was drawn up in consultation with its users.

In January 2010, the site launched its 'Let Girls Be Girls' campaign. The campaign challenged retailers to ensure that they did not contribute to the premature sexualisation of children through their products and marketing. In December 2010, Let Girls Be Girls was extended, calling for an end to the display of 'Lads' Mags' in the view of children in supermarkets and stores. The campaign received the support of the main UK magazine retailers, with the exception of WHSmith.

In January 2011, Riven Vincent, a regular Mumsnet user with a severely disabled child, received widespread media attention after posting on the site about her despair in the face of local budget cuts. In response to Vincent's plight, Mumsnet launched its 'Respite Care' campaign, which called on local authorities to provide adequate short breaks for families with disabled children.

In June 2013, the site launched a campaign to end sales representatives on maternity wards, following numerous complaints of bad practice and a user survey in which 82% of respondents found it unacceptable for commercial companies to access new mothers on hospital wards. The campaign called on members to write to their local NHS Trusts and MPs, as well as to share their stories of run-ins with sales reps. In response, a number of NHS Trusts across the UK cancelled or revised their contracts with commercial companies, with over 75 MPs signing an Early Day Motion calling for a ban on sales reps in wards.

In August 2013, the site launched the awareness-raising campaign 'This Is My Child', which aimed to support parents of children with additional needs in raising awareness of how the general public could help make the lives of those caring for children with additional needs easier. The site produced a myth-busting guide to additional needs for the public, supporting material produced by its users and partner organisations (Mencap, Contact a Family and Every Disabled Child Matters), and hosted a series of blogs and webchats on parenting a child with additional needs.

In May 2017, the site launched a new campaign called 'Better Postnatal Care: Aftercare, not Afterthought', which aimed to address major failings in the postnatal care system found in their 2017 survey.

In January 2025, the site launched 'Rage Against the Screens', a campaign to inform parents about the dangers of smartphones and social media, and empower them to take action to protect their children's health.

== Criticism ==
The forum has been portrayed in the media as being populated by pushy and anxious mothers, including on TV comedy shows such as Outnumbered, How Are You? It's Alan (Partridge) and Bad Education.

In 2018, Catriona Jones of the University of Hull alleged that websites such as Mumsnet, which focused on graphic and negative accounts of childbirth, had led to a rise in tokophobia (fear of childbirth) in Britain.

=== Fathers4Justice ===
In March 2012, Fathers4Justice launched a campaign highlighting Mumsnet's alleged agenda of misandry. The campaign included a naked protest at Marks and Spencer, one of Mumsnet's advertisers, with the protestors stating it was an attempt to draw attention to the "naked truth" that Mumsnet promoted gender hatred. Fathers4Justice activist Matt O'Connor stated that "When you look at the language being used in some of these forums, you can see how unacceptable it would be if it was aimed towards other races or sexualities, but it seems to be widely accepted against men."

=== Transphobia accusations ===
The site has been criticized on the grounds it hosts transphobic content. In 2018, Mumsnet introduced new rules regarding discussion of transgender issues after controversy surrounding allegations of allowing transphobic discussion, a move which was seen as a broadly positive change by LGBT rights group HERO, but faced criticism for restricting use of the terms 'cisgender' and 'TERF'. Eve Livingston, writing for Vice, described the forum as a "toxic hotbed of transphobia". Edie Miller, writing for The Outline in 2018, stated that "Mumsnet is to British transphobia more like what 4chan is to American fascism. The tendencies were already there, but a messageboard to amplify them and recruit people to the cause never hurts."

In October 2019, Upfield, the makers of Flora margarine, withdrew from a "Mumsnet rated" promotional agreement after campaigners drew attention to alleged transphobic content on the site.

However, Mumsnet has also been praised for allowing women to openly discuss sex and gender and related issues including protection of single-sex spaces and the treatment of children with gender dysphoria. James Kirkup wrote that "Justine Roberts has shown she has the balls to stand up for free speech and sensible political debate", and journalist Hadley Freeman said the site's stance was "hugely important".

Mumsnet's moderation principles for discussions around gender identity and sex prohibit transphobia, and assert that the site is "committed to allowing free and open discussion of difficult subjects in order to promote understanding and compromise".

In April 2025, after the Supreme Court ruling on the meaning of the word 'women' in the Equality Act, Justine Roberts revealed that online supermarket Ocado had pulled out of a potential advertising partnership, citing "hateful political views", after Mumsnet included a call for clarity in its 2024 General Election Manifesto. Ocado offered an "unreserved apology" and said the comments were not representative of their views as a company.

== Endorsements ==
In 2020 and 2021, two studies by academics at University College London (UCL) highlighted the importance of the site for parents of children with mental health needs, as well as the high quality of the advice and support that these parents receive from other users.

In 2024, in evidence to the House of Lords Communications and Digital Select Committee Inquiry: the future of news: impartiality, trust and technology, professors Sarah Pedersen and Simon Burnett described Mumsnet as a "trusted 'third space'" for women, and wrote that "through Mumsnet, users are able to avoid the aggression and misogynistic abuse women face when they attempt to discuss news in the wider public sphere of the Internet".

Actress and comedian Daisy May Cooper described her show "Am I Being Unreasonable?" as her 'tribute' to the women on Mumsnet who supported her as her marriage broke down. The show was named after the Mumsnet forum of the same name.
