= Gender polarization =

Sociological concept by Sandra Bem

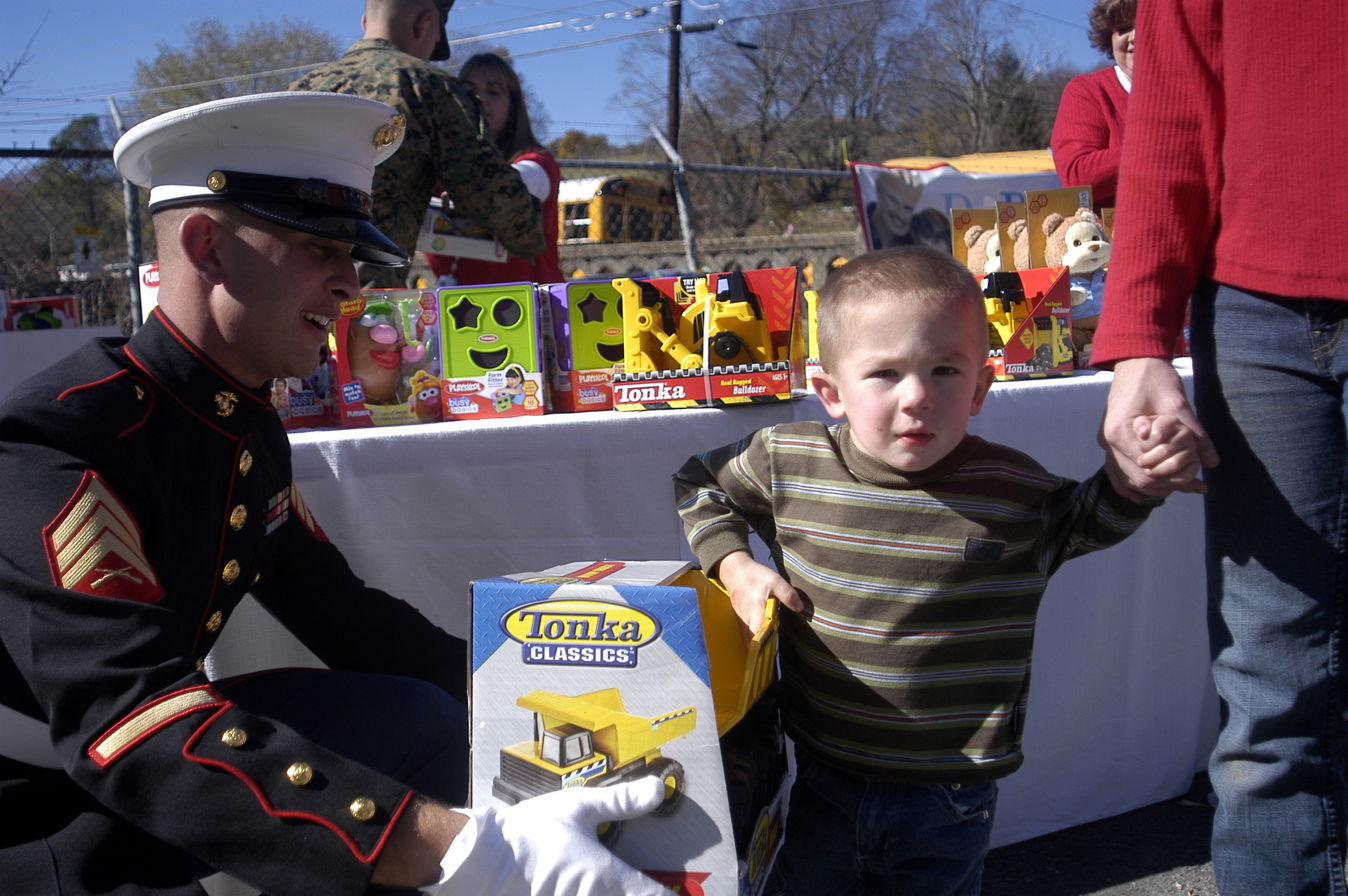
Boys are encouraged to play with toy trucks.

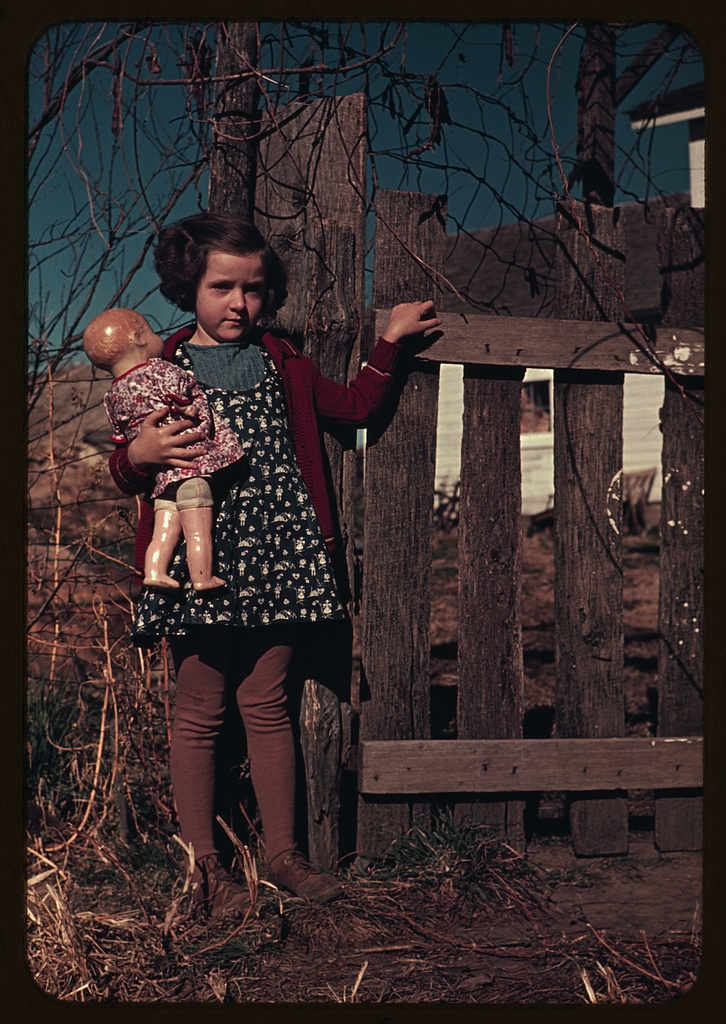
Girls are encouraged to play with dolls.

In sociology, gender polarization is a concept first described by American psychologist Sandra Bem which states that societies tend to define femininity and masculinity as polar opposite genders, such that male-acceptable behaviors and attitudes are not seen as appropriate for women, and vice versa. The theory is an extension of the sex and gender distinction in sociology in which sex refers to biological characteristics such as genitalia, while gender refers to the cultural and social characteristics, such that gender describes the "socially constructed roles, behaviours, activities, and attributes that a given society considers appropriate for men and women". According to Bem, gender polarization begins when natural sex differences are exaggerated in culture; for example, women have less hair than men, and men have more muscles than women, but these physical differences are exaggerated culturally when women remove hair from their faces and legs and armpits, and when men engage in body building exercises to emphasize their muscle mass. She explained that gender polarization goes further, when cultures construct "differences from scratch to make the sexes even more different from one another than they would otherwise be", perhaps by dictating specific hair styles for men and women, which are noticeably distinct, or separate clothing styles for men and women. When genders become polarized, according to the theory, there is no overlap, no shared behaviors or attitudes between men and women; rather, they are distinctly opposite. She argued that these distinctions become so "all-encompassing" that they "pervade virtually every aspect of human existence", not just hairstyles and clothing but how men and women express emotion and experience sexual desire. She argued that male-female differences are "superimposed on so many aspects of the social world that a cultural connection is thereby forged between sex and virtually every other aspect of human experience".

Bem saw gender polarization as an organizing principle upon which many of the basic institutions of a society are built. For example, rules based on gender polarization have been codified into law. In western society in the fairly recent past, such rules have prevented women from voting, holding political office, going to school, owning property, serving in the armed forces, entering certain professions, or playing specific sports. For example, the first modern Olympics was a male-only sporting event from which women were excluded, and this has been identified as a prime example of gender polarization. In addition, the term has been applied to literary criticism.

According to Scott Coltrane and Michele Adams, gender polarization begins early in childhood when girls are encouraged to prefer pink over blue, and when boys are encouraged to prefer toy trucks over dolls, and the male-female distinction is communicated to children in countless ways. Children learn by observing others and by direct tutelage what they "can and cannot do in terms of gendered behavior", according to Elizabeth Lindsey and Walter Zakahi. Bem argued that gender polarization defines mutually exclusive scripts for being male and female. The scripts can have a powerful influence on how a person develops; for example, if a person is a male, then he will likely grow to develop specific ways of looking at the world, with certain behaviors seen as 'masculine', and learn to dress, walk, talk, and even think in a socially-approved way for men. Further, any deviation from these scripts was seen as problematic, possibly defined as "immoral acts" which flout religious customs, or seen as "psychologically pathological". Bem argued that because of past polarization, women were often restricted to family-oriented roles in the private sphere, while men were seen as professional representatives in the public sphere. Cultures vary substantially by what is considered to be appropriate for masculine and feminine roles, and by how emotions are expressed.

== Traditional gender roles ==
Traditional gender roles refer to societal expectations and norms that dictate people's behaviors, attitudes, and responsibilities based on their perceived sex or gender. Throughout history, these roles have often been rigid and dichotomous with men expected to be providers and assertive and women were supposed to do the caregiving and domestic roles. These roles not only shape individuals' behavior but also influence societal institutions such as family dynamics, employment opportunities, and legal rights. Despite evolving understandings of gender, traditional gender roles continue to influence expectations and perceptions in many cultures, impacting individuals' self-expression and opportunities.

== Historical examples ==
Ancient Greece

Men were primarily seen as active citizens, engaged in public life, politics, and warfare. They held legal rights, participated in philosophical discussions, and were considered the heads of households. On the other hand, women were mostly confined to the private sphere to focus on domestic duties and child-rearing. Their roles were restricted and limited their participation in public life and education. This strict division of roles and expectations created a clear distinction between masculinity and femininity.

Renaissance

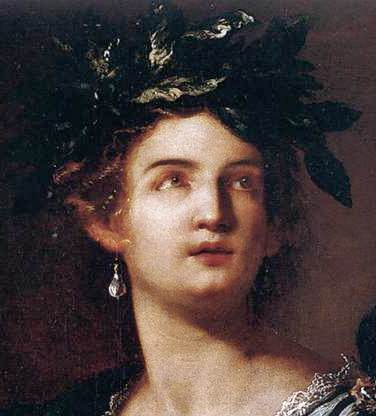

Roles were predominantly the same as in Ancient Greece however there were some differences. The Renaissance brought some advancements in women's education and artistic endeavors but these were often exceptions rather than the norm. For example, Artemisia Gentileschi was an Italian Baroque painter and is considered one of the most influential artists in a male-dominated sphere. Similarly, Laura Cereta was an Italian humanist who wrote mainly literary works advocating for women's education and intellectual pursuits.

Enlightenment

The Enlightenment's emphasis on reason and individual rights initially sparked discussions on gender equality, yet traditional roles largely persisted.

Industrial Revolution

The Industrial Revolution saw a transformation in work, with more women entering factories and mills, particularly in textile industries. While this provided new employment opportunities for women outside the home, they often faced poor working conditions and low wages. Despite these changes, women's roles in the public sphere remained limited, and gender polarization persisted, reinforcing distinct expectations and constraints based on gender.

Women's suffrage movement

Gender polarization underwent significant changes during the women's suffrage movement as there was advocating for women's right to vote. This challenged traditional gender roles and norms by demanding political equality.

World War I and World War II

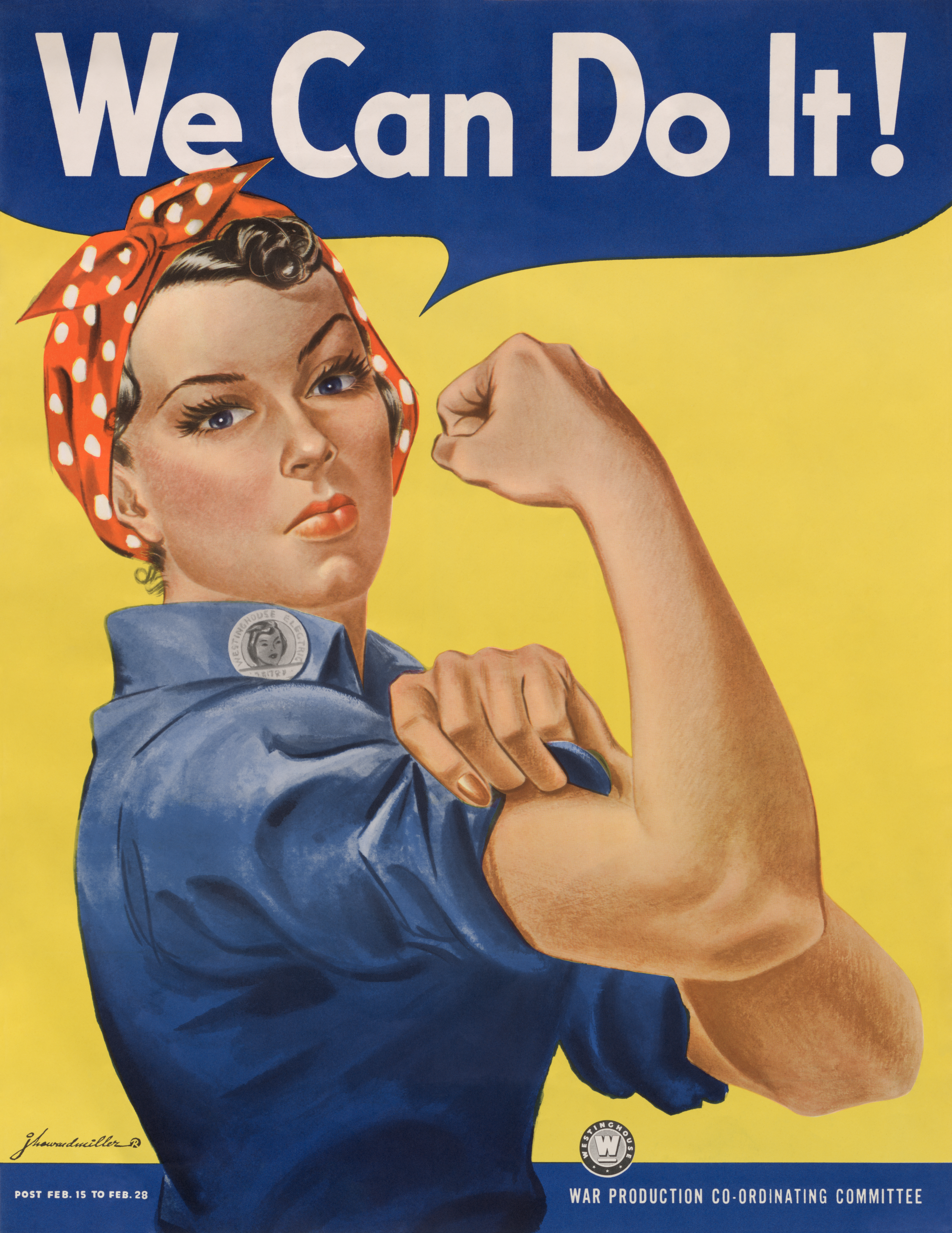

Women's involvement in World War I and World War II further disrupted conventional roles as they took on jobs traditionally held by men while men were at war. These shifts contributed to changing perceptions of women's capabilities and roles in society. However, the post-war period saw a return to traditional gender roles, highlighting the enduring nature of gender polarization.

== Evolutionary perspective ==
In hunter-gatherer societies, gender polarization was rooted in the division of labor based on biological differences. Men typically engaged in hunting and providing food and protection. Women focused on gathering, childcare, and domestic tasks. These roles were influenced by physical attributes. For example, men's strength and stamina suited them for hunting while women's reproductive roles and gathering skills were valued. This division of labor reinforced distinct gender roles with men and women having separate spheres of activity and responsibility. Overall, this established an early form of gender polarization based on biological differences and societal needs.

== Contemporary gender polarization ==
Third-wave feminism has critiqued traditional gender binaries which challenges the strict categorization of masculinity and femininity. This movement emphasizes fluidity and intersectionality and advocates for a broader understanding of gender identities and expressions. There has been significant progress in LGBTQ+ rights and acceptance which also challenges societal norms around gender and sexuality. Debates on gender polarization in the 2020s often center on representation, stereotypes, and the impact of gender norms on individuals and society at large.

Intersex

Intersex individuals challenge the traditional binary understanding of gender polarization which categorizes people strictly as male or female based on biological sex characteristics. Intersex people are born with variations in sex characteristics that do not fit typical definitions of male or female such as variations in chromosomes, genitalia, and/or reproductive anatomy.

Intersectionality

Different cultural norms and values can either reinforce or challenge traditional gender roles, adding layers of complexity to individual identities. Socioeconomic status significantly impacts gender experiences, with economic disparities often amplifying gender inequalities. Within marginalized communities, gender polarization can be especially pronounced as individuals navigate multiple layers of discrimination and exclusion.

== See also ==
- Gender binary
- Gender discrimination
- Gender identity
- Gender role
- Heterosexuality
- Men Are from Mars, Women Are from Venus
- Separate spheres
- Stereotypes
